= Golczowice, Prudnik County =

Golczowice Golschowitz
- Village
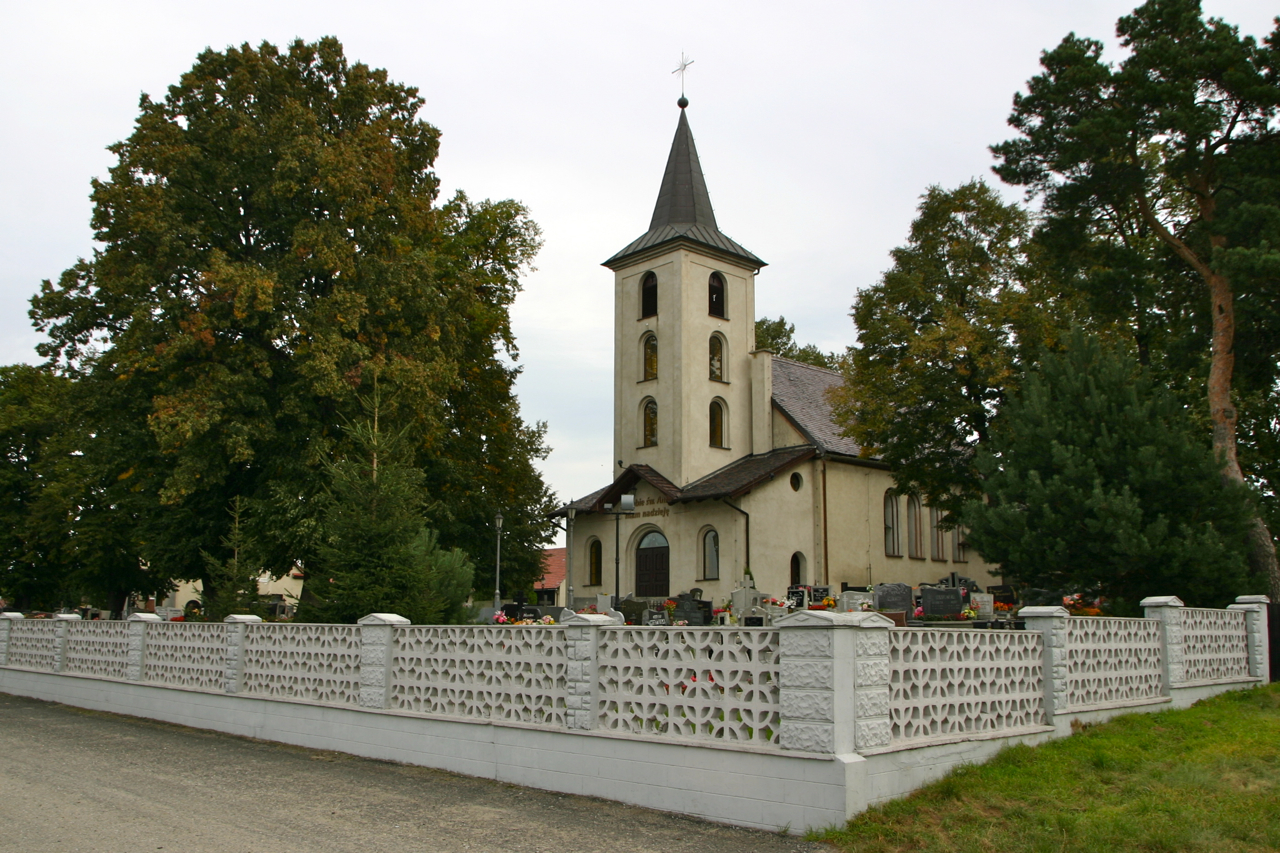
- Saint Anne church

- Location within Poland
- Coordinates: 50°23′45″N 17°47′47″E
- Country: Poland
- Voivodeship: Opole
- County: Prudnik
- Gmina: Głogówek
- First mentioned: 1419

Population (2022)
  - Total: 93
- Time zone: UTC+1 (CET)
  - Summer (DST): UTC+2
- Postal code: 48-250
- Area code: +4877
- Vehicle registration: OPR

Golczowice ([ɡɔlt͡ʂɔˈvit͡sɛ], additional name in German: Golschowitz) is a village in the administrative district of Gmina Głogówek, within Prudnik County, Opole Voivodeship, southern Poland. It is situated in the historical region of Prudnik Land in Upper Silesia.

As of 31 December 2022, the village's population numbered 93 inhabitants. A significant portion of them belongs to the German minority in Poland.

== Geography ==
The village is located in the southern part of Opole Voivodeship, close to the Czech Republic–Poland border. It is situated in the historical Prudnik Land region, as well as in Upper Silesia. It lies in the Silesian Lowlands. The National Register of Geographical Names for 2025 classified Golczowice as a hamlet (przysiółek) of Zawada.

== Etymology ==
In Topographisches Handbuch von Oberschlesien, published in 1865, Felix Triest noted the village's German name as Golschowitz, and its Polish name as Golczowice. In 1936, Nazi administration of the German Reich changed the village's name to Goldenau.

Following the Second World War, the historic Polish name Golczowice was declared official by the Commission for the Determination of Place Names on 1 October 1948. As Gmina Głogówek gained the bilingual status on 1 December 2009, the government introduced an additional German name for the village: Golschowitz.

== History ==
Traces of human presence in the area of the present-day village of Golczowice, confirmed by archaeological research, date back to the Stone Age and the Bronze Age.

The village's name was first recorded in a document published in 1419. There was a folwark in the village. The village was completely abandoned in the 16th century due to the wars and riots that occurred in the previous century. According to a document signed on 10 December 1595 in Wrocław, there was an inn and a pond in Golczowice, which belonged to the Głogówek estate.

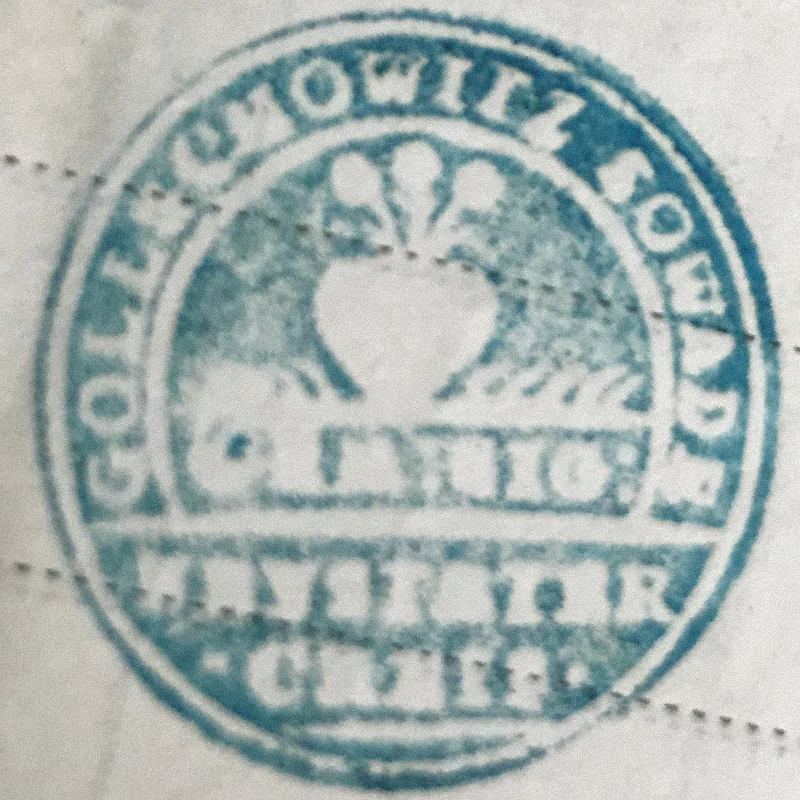
19th-century sigil

Until 1532 it was part of the Piast-ruled Duchy of Opole and Racibórz formed as a result of the medieval fragmentation of Poland into smaller duchies. Afterwards, it was integrated into the Bohemian Crown and Habsburg Empire, administratively becoming part of Głogówek County (circulus superioris Glogoviae) until 1742, and returning to Polish rule under the House of Vasa from 1645 to 1666. In 1724, a wooden Saint Anne church was built in Golczowice. After the First Silesian War, it was annexed by the Kingdom of Prussia was incorporated into Prudnik County (Großkreis Neustadt). The wooden church burnt down in 1764. Friedrich Albert Zimmermann noted in 1784 that Golczowice belonged to the Schaffgotsch family.

A new Saint Anne church was constructed in the years 1843–1848 in a place where victims of the 1831 cholera epidemic were buried. The villages of Golczowice and Zawada had their own sigil. In the 19th century, there was a watermill in Golczowice.

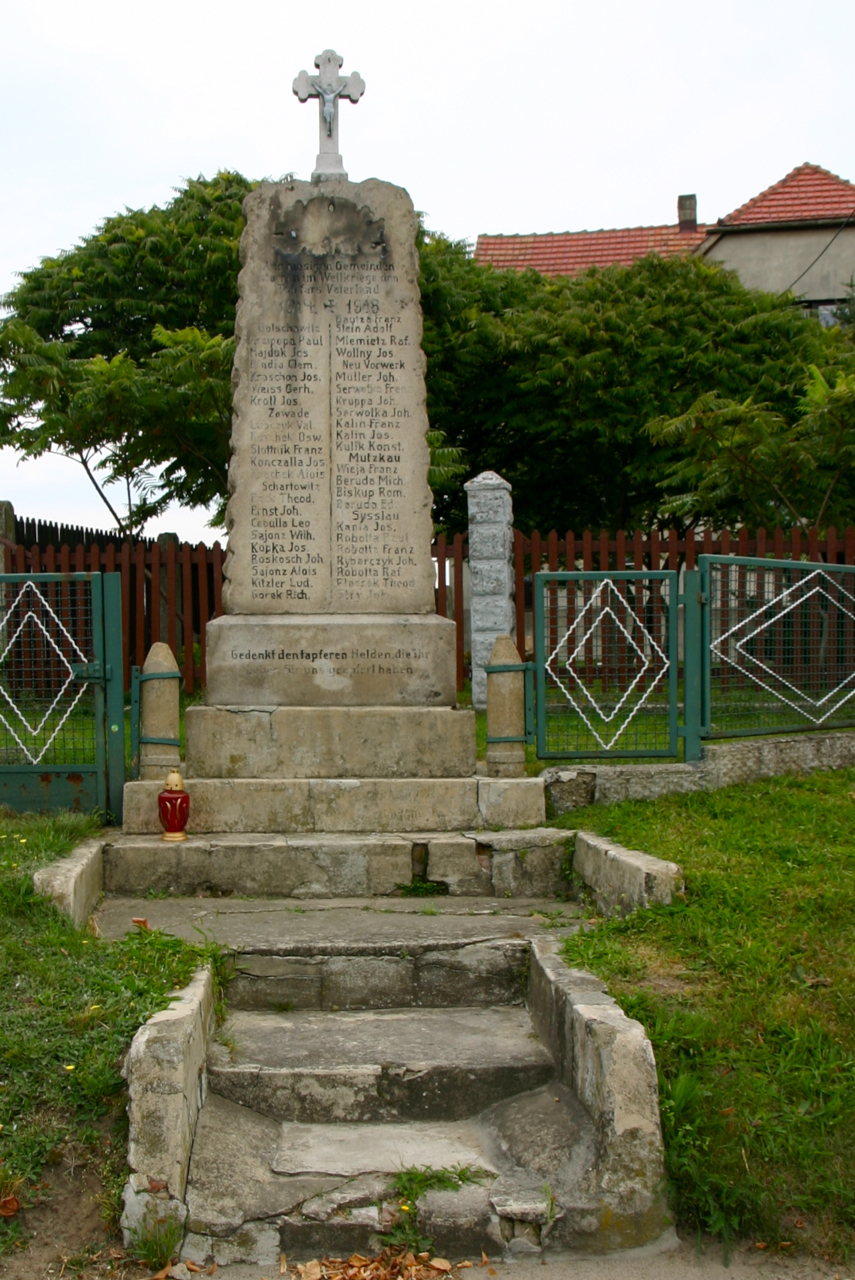
War monument

After the First World War, a monument dedicated to people from Golczowice, Zawada, Czartowice, But, Mucków, and Sysłów, who died in the war, was erected in the village. Only a portion of Prudnik County participated in the 1921 Upper Silesia plebiscite, which was supposed to determine ownership of the Province of Upper Silesia between Germany and Poland. Golczowice found itself in the eastern part of the county, within the plebiscite area. In the end Golczowice remained in Germany.

During the Second World War, on 18 March 1945, the Soviet Red Army encircled several German divisions in the area of Golczowice. On 19 March, a command post of the Wehrmacht was set up in the village. Following the Second World War, from March to May 1945, Prudnik County was controlled by the Soviet military commandant's office. On 11 May 1945, it was passed on to the Polish administration. Autochthonous inhabitants of Golczowice, who either knew Polish or spoke Silesian, were allowed to remain in the village.

== Demographics ==
Golczowice is inhabited by autochthonous Silesians and Germans. They belong to the registered German minority in Poland. The residents speak the Prudnik dialect of the Silesian language. The villaged gained the bilingual Polish-German status in 2009.

== Transport ==
County road number 1281O (Żabnik—Nowa Wieś Prudnicka—Czartowice—Golczowice—Zawada) runs through the village. The local public transport buses were operated by PKS Prudnik. Since 2021, public transit is organized by the PGZT "Pogranicze" corporation in Prudnik.

== Religion ==
The Roman Catholic Saint Anne church is located in the village. The church is a seat of the local parish, which belongs to the Diocese of Opole.

== Bibliography ==
- Lesiuk, Wiesław (1978). Ziemia Prudnicka. Dzieje, gospodarka, kultura. Urząd Miasta i Gminy w Prudniku, Wydawnictwo Instytutu Śląskiego w Opolu. OCLC 251643861.
- Hellfeier, Robert (2014). Smolarnia – 350 lat historii (PDF). Smolarnia: Gmina Strzeleczki. ISBN 978-83-63233-26-6.
- "Studium uwarunkowań i kierunków zagospodarowania przestrzennego miasta i gminy Głogówek" (PDF). bip.glogowek.pl (in Polish). 2016.
- "Plan Odnowy Wsi Zawada z przysiółkami But, Golczowice, Mucków i Sysłow na lata 2020–2030" (PDF). bip.glogowek.pl (in Polish). 2020.
