= Kapełków =

- Village
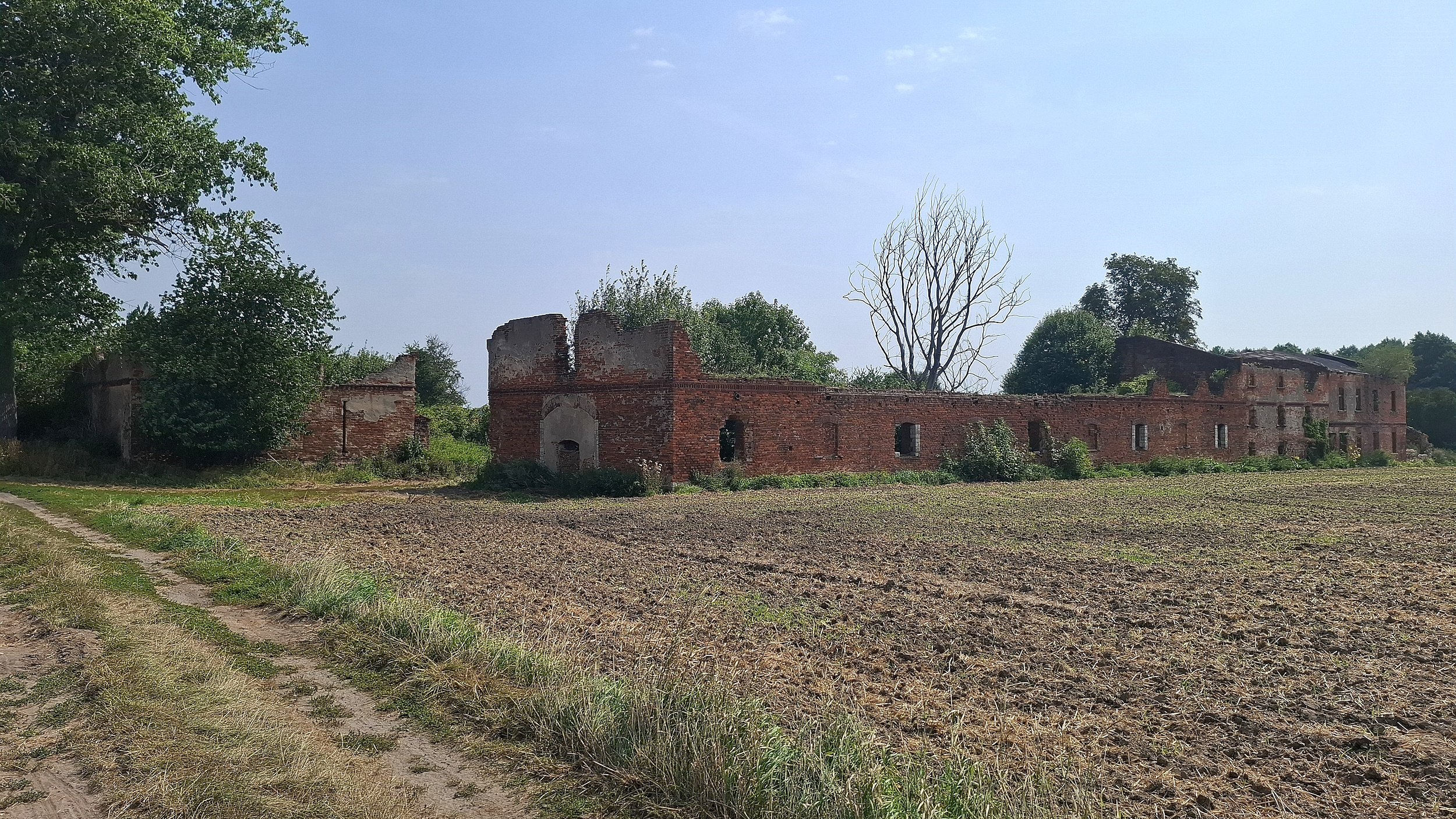

- Location within Poland
- Coordinates: 50°20′59″N 17°58′46″E
- Country: Poland
- Voivodeship: Opole
- County: Prudnik
- Gmina: Głogówek
- Time zone: UTC+1 (CET)
  - Summer (DST): UTC+2
- Postal code: 48-250
- Area code: +48 77
- Vehicle registration: OPR

Kapełków (German: Kapelka) is a village in the administrative district of Gmina Głogówek, within Prudnik County, Opole Voivodeship, in southern Poland. It is situated in the historical region of Prudnik Land.

== Geography ==
The village is located in the southern part of Opole Voivodeship, close to the Czech Republic–Poland border. It is situated in the historical Prudnik Land region, as well as in Upper Silesia. It lies in the Silesian Lowlands, in the valley of Stradunia river. The National Register of Geographical Names for 2025 classified Kapełków as a part (część wsi) of Biedrzychowice.

== Etymology ==
In the German times, the village's name was Kapelka. It was derived from a Polish word kapać (to drip). In 1936, Nazi administration of the German Reich changed the village's name to Molken.

Following the Second World War, the Polish name Wydzieracz was introduced by the Commission for the Determination of Place Names on 1 October 1948. It was also called Kapołków.

== History ==
Artifacts of the Przeworsk culture were found by a road between Biedrzychowice and Kapełków.

Until 1532 it was part of the Piast-ruled Duchy of Opole and Racibórz formed as a result of the medieval fragmentation of Poland into smaller duchies. Afterwards, it was integrated into the Bohemian Crown and Habsburg Empire, administratively becoming part of Głogówek County (circulus superioris Glogoviae) until 1742, and returning to Polish rule under the House of Vasa from 1645 to 1666. After the First Silesian War, it was annexed by the Kingdom of Prussia was incorporated into Prudnik County (Großkreis Neustadt). In 1780, the folwark of Kapełków was bought by Heinrich Leopold von Seherr-Thoss and incorporated into the Dobra estate.

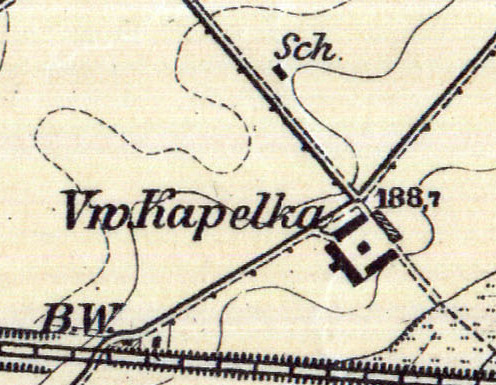
1913 map of Kapełków

Meyers Gazetteer noted that there were 96 people living in Kapełków. Only a portion of Prudnik County participated in the 1921 Upper Silesia plebiscite, which was supposed to determine ownership of the Province of Upper Silesia between Germany and Poland. Kapełków found itself in the eastern part of the county, within the plebiscite area. In the end Kapełków remained in Germany.

Following the Second World War, from March to May 1945, Prudnik County was controlled by the Soviet military commandant's office. On 11 May 1945, it was passed on to the Polish administration. In 1966, there were 17 people living in Kapełków.

== Transport ==
The Katowice–Legnica railway (rail line number 137), which connects Upper and Lower Silesia regions, runs in the vicinity of Kapełków. The closest railway station is located in Twardawa.
