= Chmielnik, Opole Voivodeship =

Chmielnik
- Village
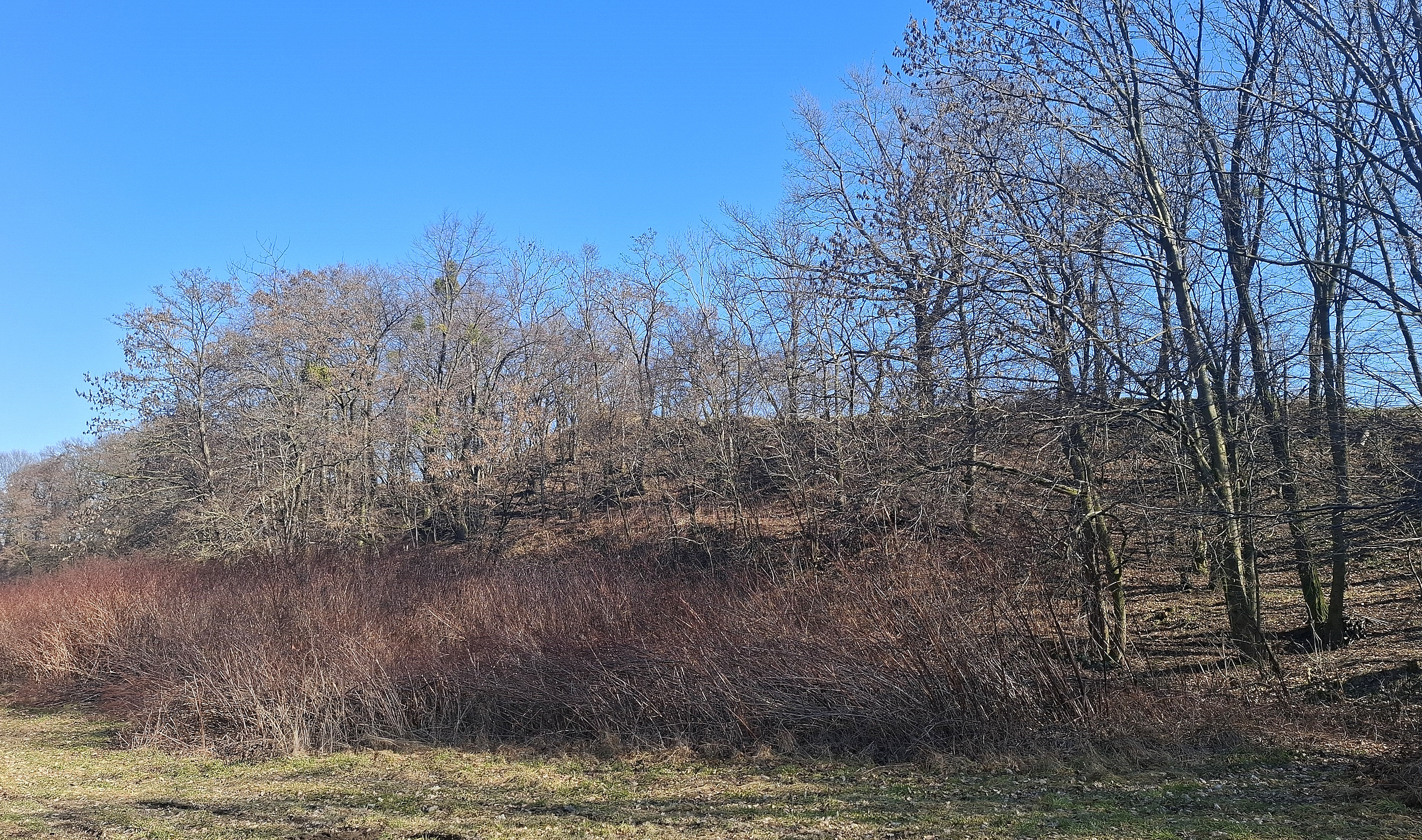

- Location within Poland
- Coordinates: 50°23′30″N 17°51′21″E
- Country: Poland
- Voivodeship: Opole
- County: Prudnik
- Gmina: Głogówek
- First mentioned: 1502
- Time zone: UTC+1 (CET)
  - Summer (DST): UTC+2
- Postal code: 48-250
- Area code: +4877
- Vehicle registration: OPR

Chmielnik (German: Hopfenmühle) is a village in the administrative district of Gmina Głogówek, within Prudnik County, Opole Voivodeship, in southern Poland. It is situated in the historical region of Prudnik Land in Upper Silesia.

== Geography ==
The village is located in the southern part of Opole Voivodeship, close to the Czech Republic–Poland border. It is situated in the historical Prudnik Land region, as well as in Upper Silesia. It lies in the Silesian Lowlands, in the valley of Osobłoga. The National Register of Geographical Names for 2025 classified Chmielnik as a hamlet (przysiółek) of Kierpień.

== Etymology ==
In Polish, the name Chmielnik means "a place where hop [chmiel] is grown". In historical documents, the German name of the village was noted as: Birkenmühle (1736), Körpener Mühle (1750), Chmielnik-M. (1931). The name Birkenmühle was used by German-speaking Cistercians, while local Silesians called the village Młyn Chmielniczki. At the start of the 19th century, German names Chmielniker-Mühle and Kerppener-Mühle were used.

== History ==
16th-century documents mention a hill named Chmielnik, north-east of the nearby village Kierpień. There was a hop planation there. In the late Middle Ages, monks of the Cistercian order from Kazimierz raised a watermill on a meadow on top of the hill, by the Osobłoga river. The hill belonged to Cistercians until the 1810 secularization.

The first mention of a destroyed watermill in Chmielnik was recorded 1502. It was potentially destroyed by the Hussites. Following this, the territory of Chmielnik remained empty until the farming industry of Upper Silesia improved. Until 1532 it was part of the Piast-ruled Duchy of Opole and Racibórz formed as a result of the medieval fragmentation of Poland into smaller duchies. Afterwards, it was integrated into the Bohemian Crown and Habsburg Empire, administratively becoming part of Głogówek County (circulus superioris Glogoviae) until 1742, and returning to Polish rule under the House of Vasa from 1645 to 1666. In the second half of the 16th century, the watermill in Chmielnik was active again. In 1571, Chmielnik was sold with its surrounding area to count von Redern of Dobra. After the Thirty Years' War, Chmielnik was owned by the Cistercians again. After the First Silesian War, it was annexed by the Kingdom of Prussia was incorporated into Prudnik County (Großkreis Neustadt).

Michael, a Cistercian from Kazimierz, sold the local watermill to Jacob Schittko on 13 March 1656. The order kept ownership of trees surrounding the watermill. The transaction was confirmed by Johannes von Leubus on 30 September 1673. At the end of the 17th century, Chmielnik was owned by Jacob Schittko's son, whose name was also Jacob, and his wife Susanna. Since 1719, it belonged to Anton Schittko and his wife Marianna. Since 1755, the watermill was owned by Franz Schittko, who bought it from his brother Joseph. In 1814, Johann Schittko bought the watermill from his father. The Schittko family owned Chmielnik until the 1920s, when it was taken over by the Milka family.

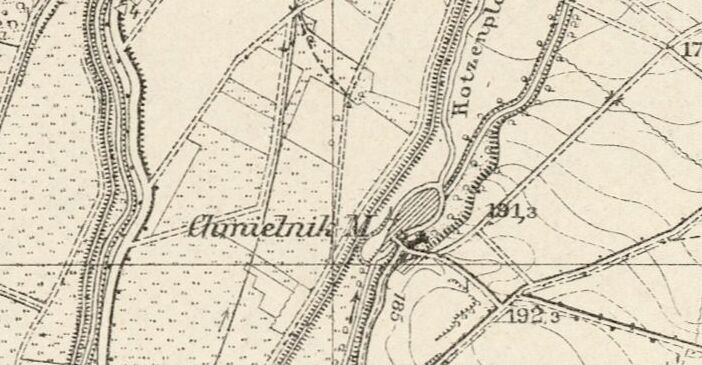
1931 map of Chmielnik

The 1903 flood damaged the watermill in Chmielnik. It ceased operating after the First World War. Only a portion of Prudnik County participated in the 1921 Upper Silesia plebiscite, which was supposed to determine ownership of the Province of Upper Silesia between Germany and Poland. Chmielnik found itself in the eastern part of the county, within the plebiscite area. In the end Chmielnik remained in Germany. A 1929 document mentioned a "former mill estate, named Chmielnikmühle".

Following the Second World War, from March to May 1945, Prudnik County was controlled by the Soviet military commandant's office. On 11 May 1945, it was passed on to the Polish administration. The village was settled by Poles expelled from the Eastern Borderlands, while the German population was expelled to Germany in accordance with the Potsdam Agreement. The watermill in Chmielnik fell into ruin and was demoshiled in the 1970s.

== Bibliography ==
- Wrobel, Ralph (2020). "Die Chmielnik-Mühle bei Kerpen: Ein Ausschnitt aus der Wirtschafts- und Familiengeschichte Oberschlesiens". Jahrbuch für Schlesische Kultur und Geschichte. Vol. 57/58. Insingen.
