= Chudoba, Prudnik County =

Chudoba Schekai
- Village
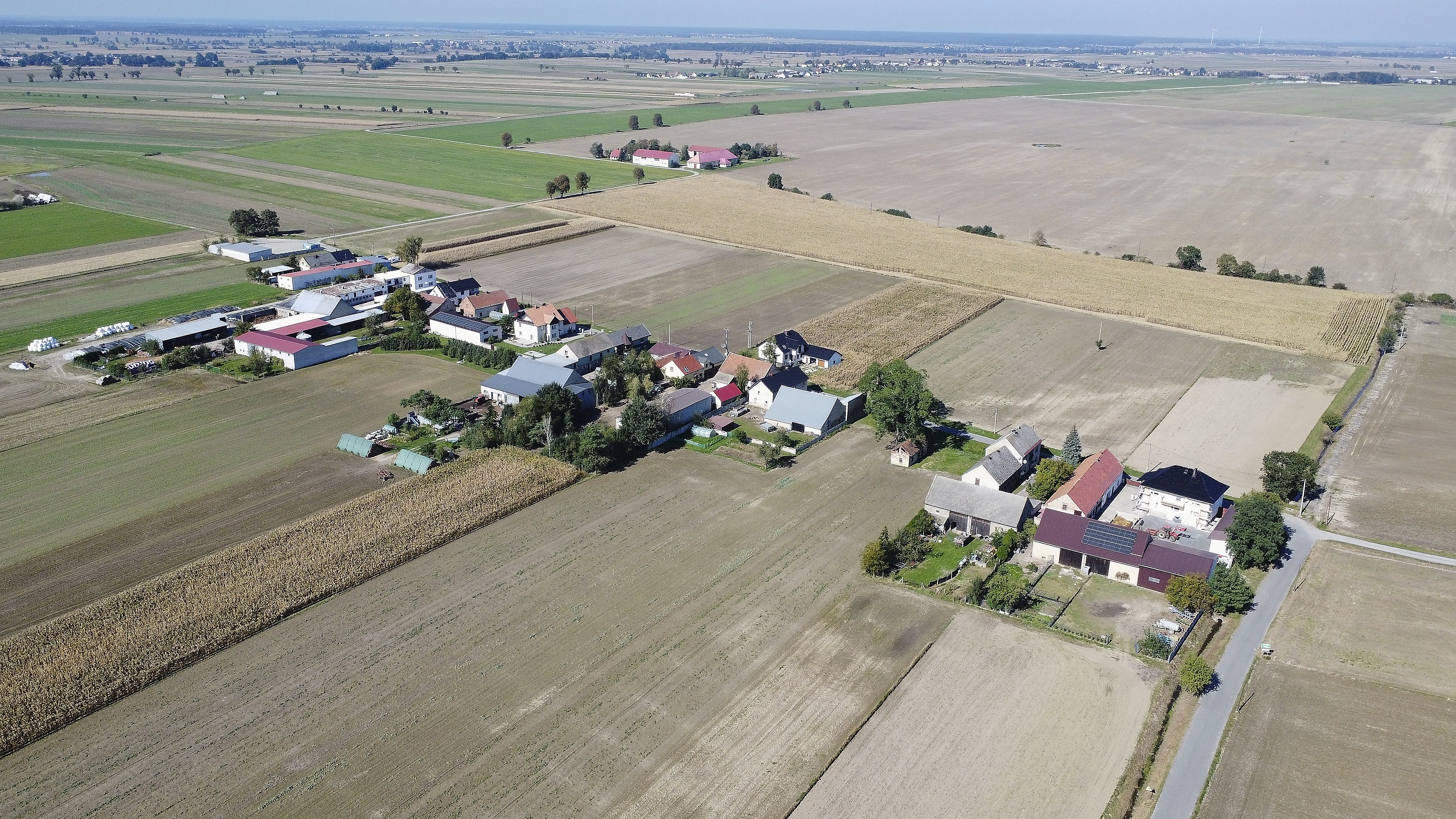
- Aerial view of the village

- Location within Poland
- Coordinates: 50°22′33″N 17°53′43″E
- Country: Poland
- Voivodeship: Opole
- County: Prudnik
- Gmina: Głogówek

Population (2022)
  - Total: 43
- Time zone: UTC+1 (CET)
  - Summer (DST): UTC+2
- Postal code: 48-250
- Area code: +4877
- Vehicle registration: OPR

Chudoba ([xuˈdɔba], additional name in German: Schekai) is a village in the administrative district of Gmina Głogówek, within Prudnik County, Opole Voivodeship, southern Poland. It is situated in the historical region of Prudnik Land in Upper Silesia.

As of 31 December 2022, the village's population numbered 43 inhabitants. A significant portion of them belongs to the German minority in Poland.

== Geography ==
The village is located in the southern part of Opole Voivodeship, close to the Czech Republic–Poland border. It is situated in the historical Prudnik Land region, as well as in Upper Silesia. It lies in the Silesian Lowlands. The National Register of Geographical Names for 2025 classified Chudoba as a hamlet (przysiółek) of Nowe Kotkowice.

== Etymology ==
In the German times, the village's name was Schekai. It was derived from a Polish word czekaj (wait), because, according to a local legend, the village was a place where bandits waited for traveling merchants to rob them. In 1936, Nazi administration of the German Reich changed the village's name to Klein Warten.

Following the Second World War, the Polish name Czekaj was introduced by the Commission for the Determination of Place Names. However, the name was not adopted by the local population, who instead called the village Chudoba. In August 2001, Gmina Głogówek decided to formally change the village's name to Chudoba. The new name was accepted by the government in 2003. As Gmina Głogówek gained the bilingual status on 1 December 2009, the government introduced an additional German name for the village: Schekai.

== History ==
Until 1532 it was part of the Piast-ruled Duchy of Opole and Racibórz formed as a result of the medieval fragmentation of Poland into smaller duchies. Afterwards, it was integrated into the Bohemian Crown and Habsburg Empire, administratively becoming part of Głogówek County (circulus superioris Glogoviae) until 1742, and returning to Polish rule under the House of Vasa from 1645 to 1666. After the First Silesian War, it was annexed by the Kingdom of Prussia was incorporated into Prudnik County (Großkreis Neustadt).

32 farmers and 15 gardeners lived in the village. Horses, cows, and pigs were bred here. There were also four forges in Chudoba. In 1910, 62 people lived in Chudoba. Only a portion of Prudnik County participated in the 1921 Upper Silesia plebiscite, which was supposed to determine ownership of the Province of Upper Silesia between Germany and Poland. Chudoba found itself in the eastern part of the county, within the plebiscite area. In the end Chudoba remained in Germany.

Following the Second World War, from March to May 1945, Prudnik County was controlled by the Soviet military commandant's office. On 11 May 1945, it was passed on to the Polish administration. Autochthonous inhabitants, who either knew Polish or spoke Silesian, were allowed to remain in the village.

== Demographics ==
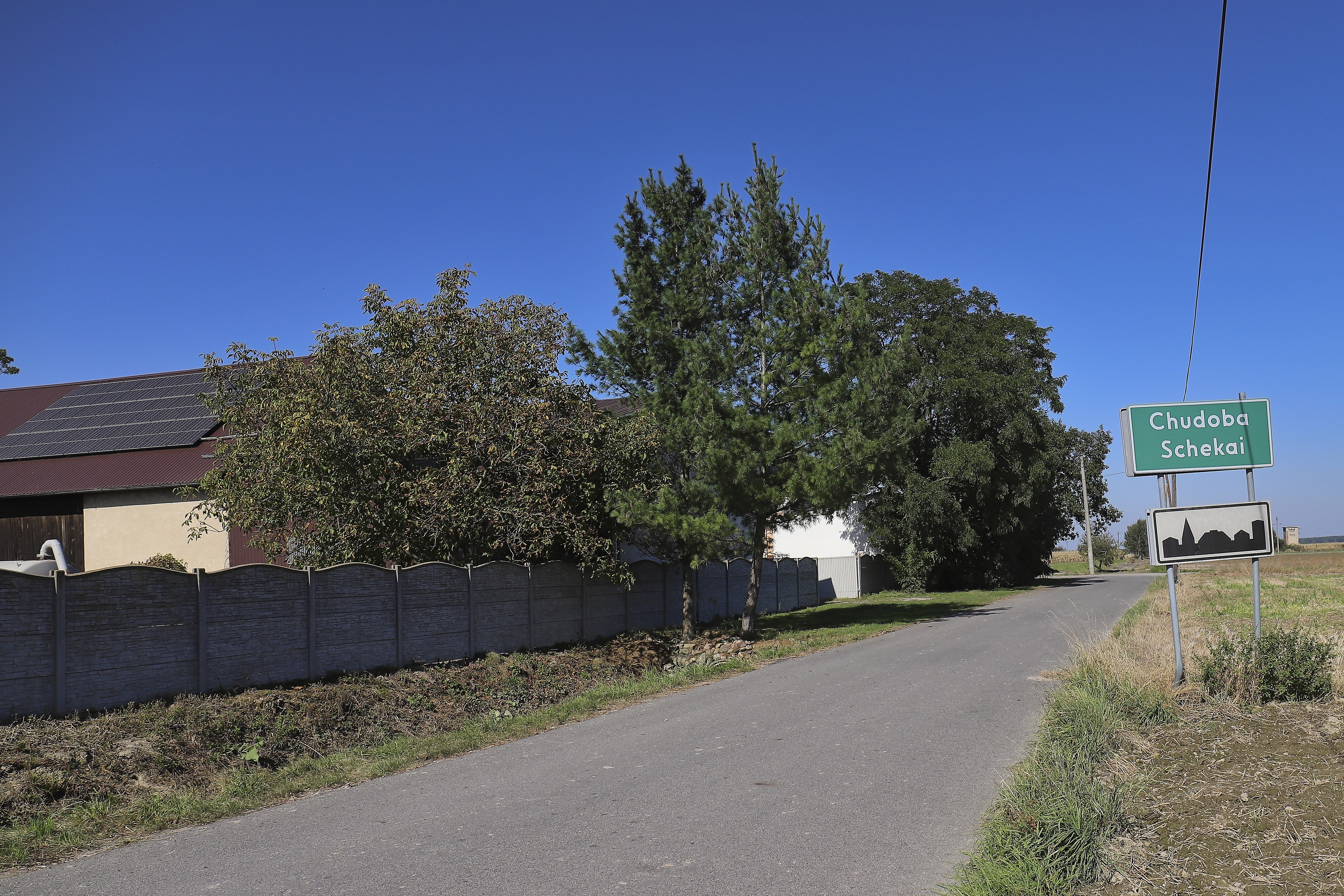
Bilingual Polish-German name sign

But is inhabited by autochthonous Silesians and Germans, belonging to the registered German minority in Poland. The residents speak the Prudnik dialect of the Silesian language. The village gained the bilingual Polish-German status in 2009.

== Transport ==
The local public transport buses were operated by PKS Prudnik. Since 2021, public transit is organized by the PGZT "Pogranicze" corporation in Prudnik.
