= Ciesznów =

- Village
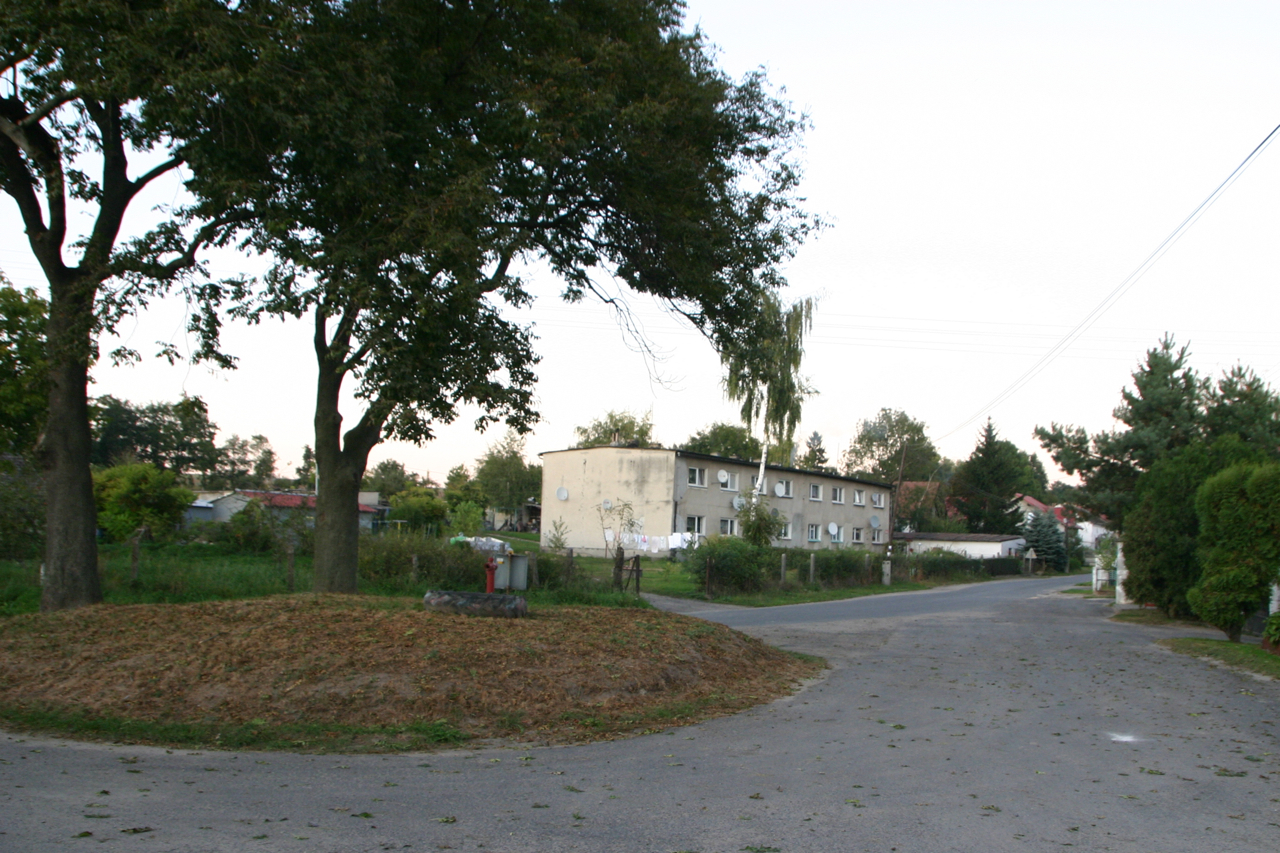
- Centre of the village

- Location within Poland
- Coordinates: 50°16′35″N 17°55′4″E
- Country: Poland
- Voivodeship: Opole
- County: Prudnik
- Gmina: Głogówek
- First mentioned: 1234

Population (2021)
  - Total: 62
- Time zone: UTC+1 (CET)
  - Summer (DST): UTC+2
- Postal code: 48-250
- Area code: +4877
- Vehicle registration: OPR

Ciesznów [ˈt͡ɕɛʂnuf] (German: Teschenau) is a village in the administrative district of Gmina Głogówek, within Prudnik County, Opole Voivodeship, in south-western Poland. It is situated in the historical region of Prudnik Land.

As of 31 December 2021, the village's population numbered 62 inhabitants.

== Geography ==
The village is located in the southern part of Opole Voivodeship, close to the Czech Republic–Poland border. It is situated in the historical Prudnik Land region, as well as in Upper Silesia. It lies in the Silesian Lowlands.

== Etymology ==
The name Ciesznów was derived from the name Cieszno or Cieszysław. The village is also called Cieśniów and Teszniów. The name was adopted into the German language as Teschenau. Following the Second World War, the Polish names Tesnów and Teśnów were introduced by the Commission for the Determination of Place Names. The name was later changed to Ciesznów.

== History ==
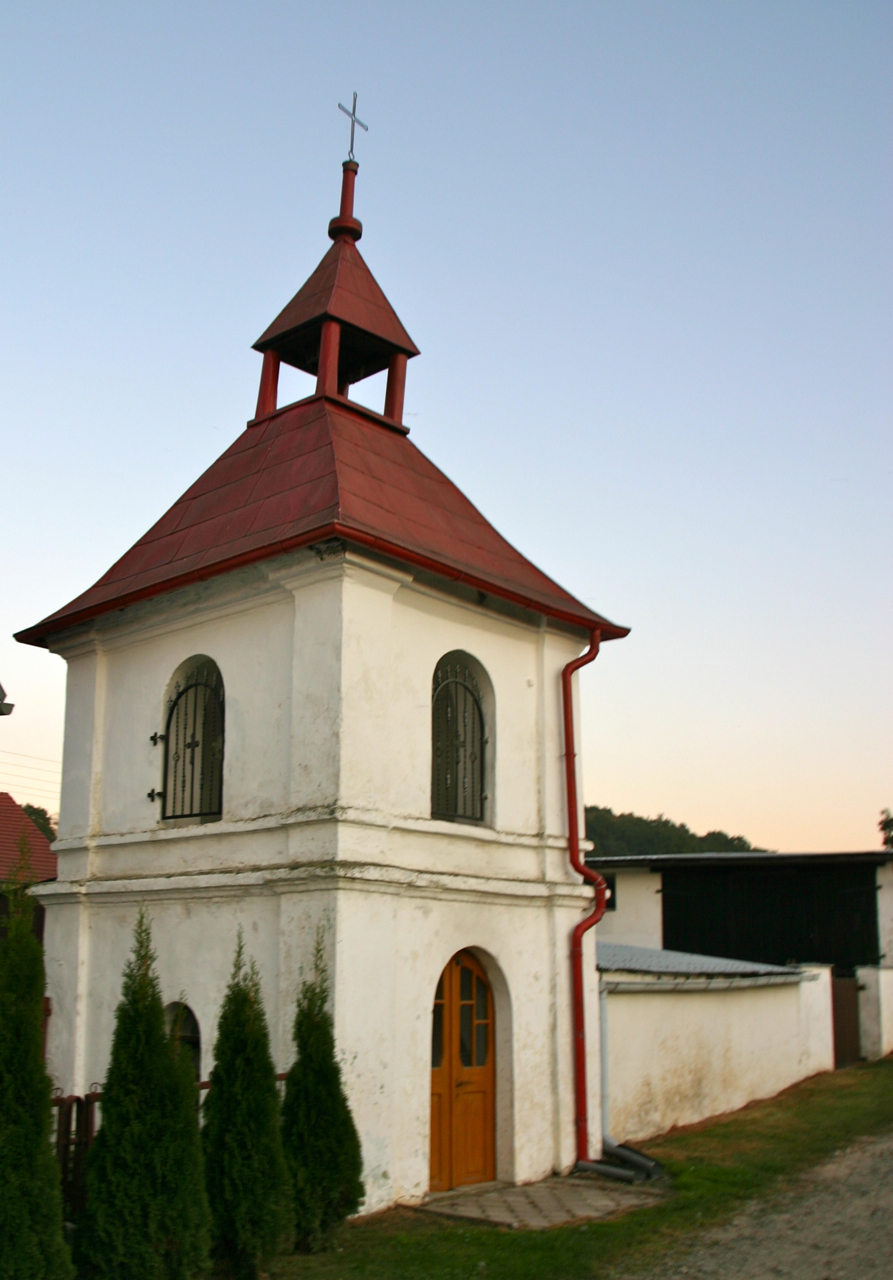
19th-century chapel, the oldest building in Ciesznów

The first mention of the village was recorded in 1234. Duke Władysław of Bytom transferred the village to knight Herman and his two brothers in 1322. There was a folwark in Ciesznów.

A chapel in Ciesznów was constructed in the 19th century and is now the oldest surviving builind in the village. The village had its own sigil.

== Demographics ==
The village is inhabited by immigrant population, resettled from Eastern Borderlands to Silesia as a result of the expulsions of Poles following the Second World War.
