= Leśnik, Opole Voivodeship =

Leśnik Leschnig
- Village
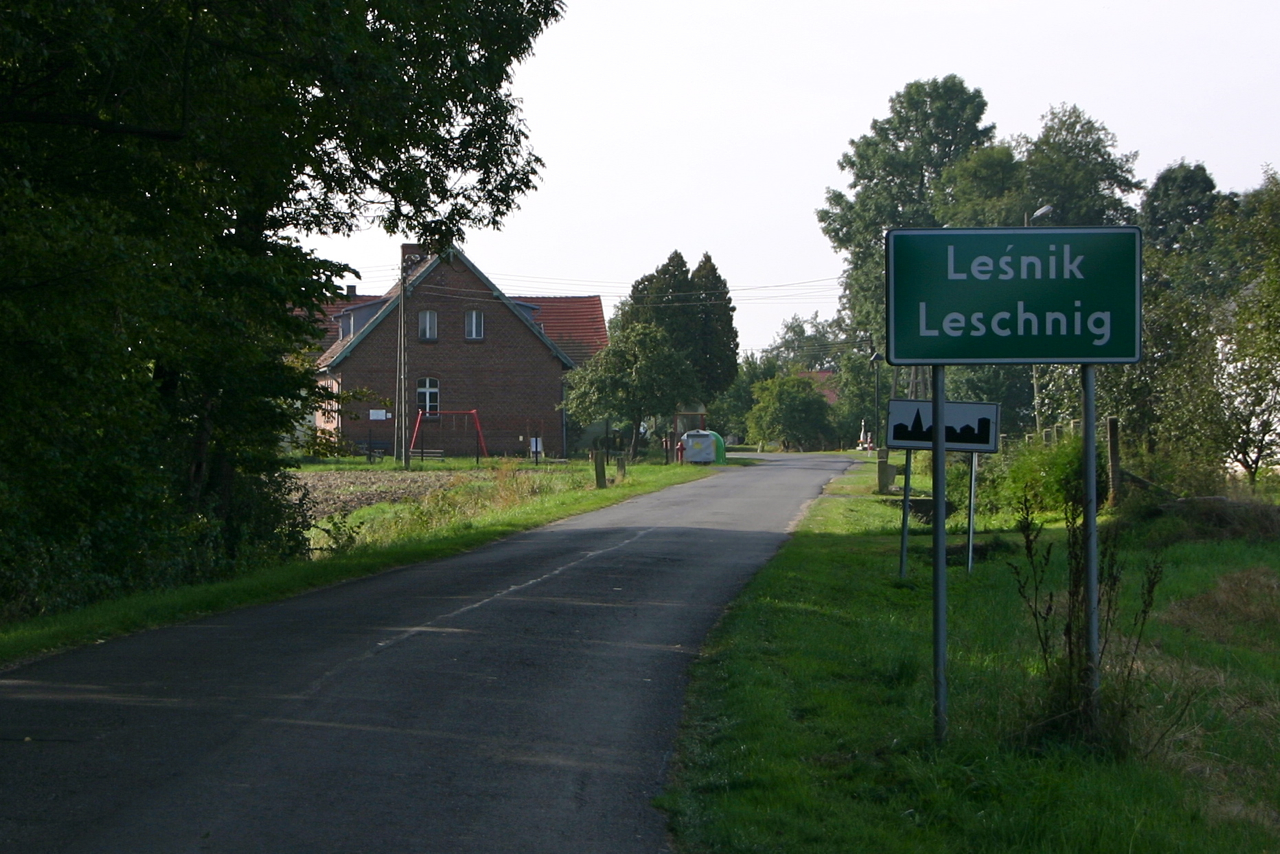

- Location within Poland
- Coordinates: 50°22′30″N 17°50′21″E
- Country: Poland
- Voivodeship: Opole
- County: Prudnik
- Gmina: Głogówek
- First mentioned: 1217
- Time zone: UTC+1 (CET)
  - Summer (DST): UTC+2 (CEST)
- Vehicle registration: OPR

Leśnik [ˈlɛɕnik], additional name in German: Leschnig, is a village in the administrative district of Gmina Głogówek, within Prudnik County, Opole Voivodeship, in southern Poland, close to the Czech border.

== Etymology ==
The name is of Polish origin, and comes from the word las, which means "forest", referring to its location.

== History ==
The first mention of the village as Lesnie dates back to 1217, when it was part of Piast-ruled Poland. The village is next mentioned in 1388, when Duke Władysław Opolczyk founded a Pauline monastery in the nearby village of Mochów. The area eventually came under the control of Austria, but was taken by the Kingdom of Prussia in the 18th century. In 1850 the village was assigned to the parish of Mochau (Mochów). Until 1900 the village operated a distillery, and a watermill was functional until it was destroyed in a flood in 1903.

Since 2009, in addition to the official Polish language, German has also been recognized as an additional secondary language.

== Sights ==
In the village there are two chapels; one dedicated to Saint Urban I and another built to commemorate the plague of 1649. There are also four crosses in the village, erected in 1899, 1906, 1913, and 1954.

== See also ==
- Prudnik Land
