= But, Opole Voivodeship =

But Neuvorwerk
- Village
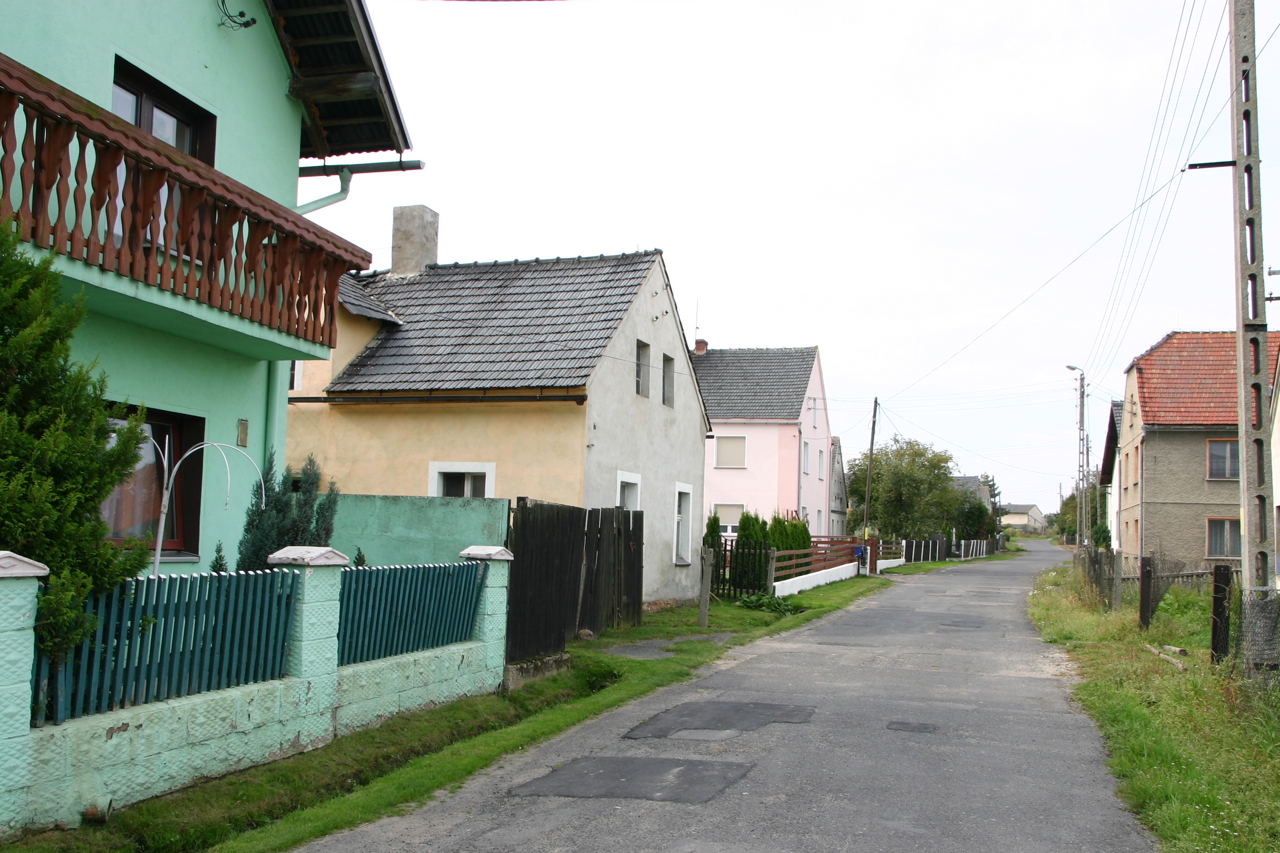
- Centre of the village

- Location within Poland
- Coordinates: 50°24′21″N 17°49′31″E
- Country: Poland
- Voivodeship: Opole
- County: Prudnik
- Gmina: Głogówek

Population (2022)
  - Total: 48
- Time zone: UTC+1 (CET)
  - Summer (DST): UTC+2
- Postal code: 48-250
- Area code: +4877
- Vehicle registration: OPR

But [but], additional name in German: Neuvorwerk, is a village in the administrative district of Gmina Głogówek, within Prudnik County, Opole Voivodeship, south-western Poland,. It is situated in the historical region of Prudnik Land.

As of 31 December 2022, the village's population numbered 48 inhabitants. A significant portion of them belongs to the German minority in Poland.

== Geography ==
The village is located in the southern part of Opole Voivodeship, close to the Czech Republic–Poland border. It is situated in the historical Prudnik Land region, as well as in Upper Silesia. It lies in the Silesian Lowlands. The National Register of Geographical Names for 2025 classified But as a hamlet (przysiółek) of Zawada.

== Etymology ==
Until 1945, the German name of the village was Neuvorwerk. Following the Second World War, the Polish name But was introduced by the Commission for the Determination of Place Names on 1 October 1948. A year later, on 15 December 1949, the name was changed to Klików. However, the name was not adopted by the local population, who instead called the village Bud.

In August 2001, Gmina Głogówek decided to formally change the village's name to Bud. The new name was not accepted by the government, which deemed it inconsistent with Polish orthography. Instead, the government accepted But as a new name for the village in 2003. As Gmina Głogówek gained the bilingual status on 1 December 2009, the government introduced an additional German name for the village: Neuvorwerk.

== History ==
Only a portion of Prudnik County participated in the 1921 Upper Silesia plebiscite, which was supposed to determine ownership of the Province of Upper Silesia between Germany and Poland. But found itself in the eastern part of the county, within the plebiscite area. In the end, the area of Prudnik, along with But, remained in Germany.

Following the Second World War, from March to May 1945, Prudnik County was controlled by the Soviet military commandant's office. On 11 May 1945, it was passed on to the Polish administration. Autochthonous inhabitants of But, who either spoke Silesian or knew Polish, were allowed to remain in the village.

== Demographics ==
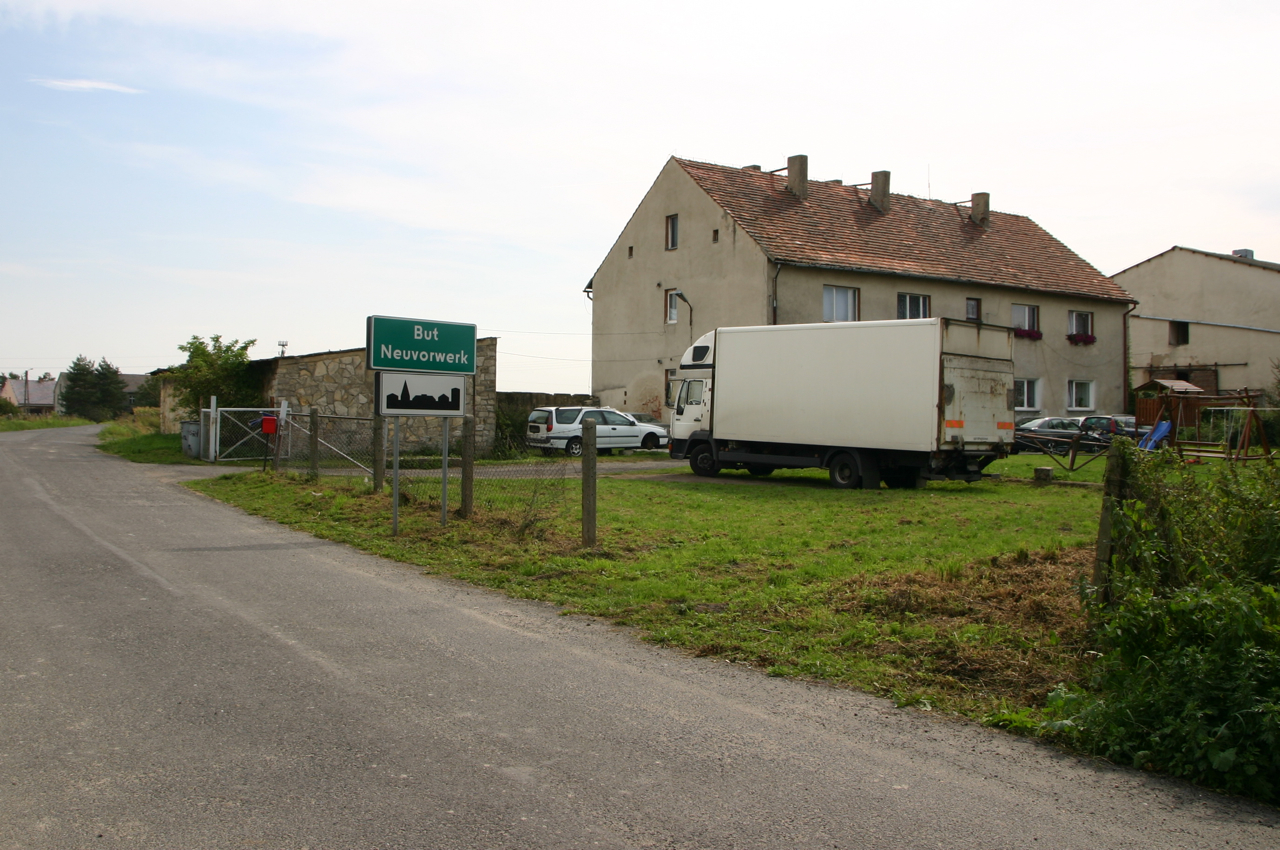
Bilingual Polish-German name sign

But is inhabited by autochthonous Germans and Silesians. They belong to the registered German minority in Poland. The residents speak the Prudnik dialect of the Silesian language. The village gained the bilingual Polish-German status in 2009.

== Transport ==
The local public transport buses were operated by PKS Prudnik. Since 2021, public transit is organized by the PGZT "Pogranicze" corporation in Prudnik.
