= Młodziejowice, Opole Voivodeship =

Młodziejowice Karolina
- Village
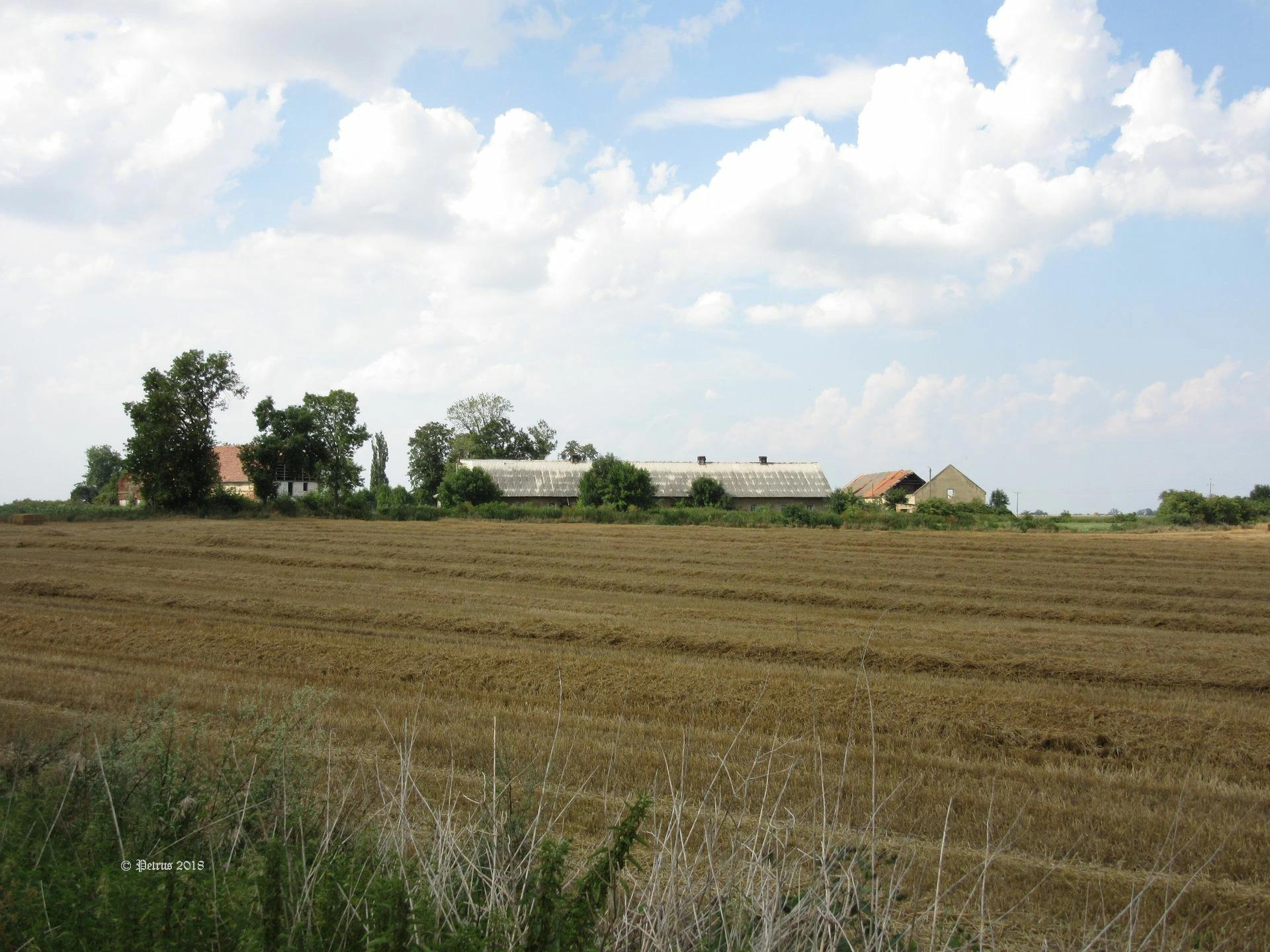

- Location within Poland
- Coordinates: 50°19′29″N 17°54′29″E
- Country: Poland
- Voivodeship: Opole
- County: Prudnik
- Gmina: Głogówek

Młodziejowice (German: Karolinenhof), additional name: Karolina, is a village in the administrative district of Gmina Głogówek, within Prudnik County, Opole Voivodeship, in south-western Poland.
