= Kolonia, Prudnik County =

Kolonia
- Village
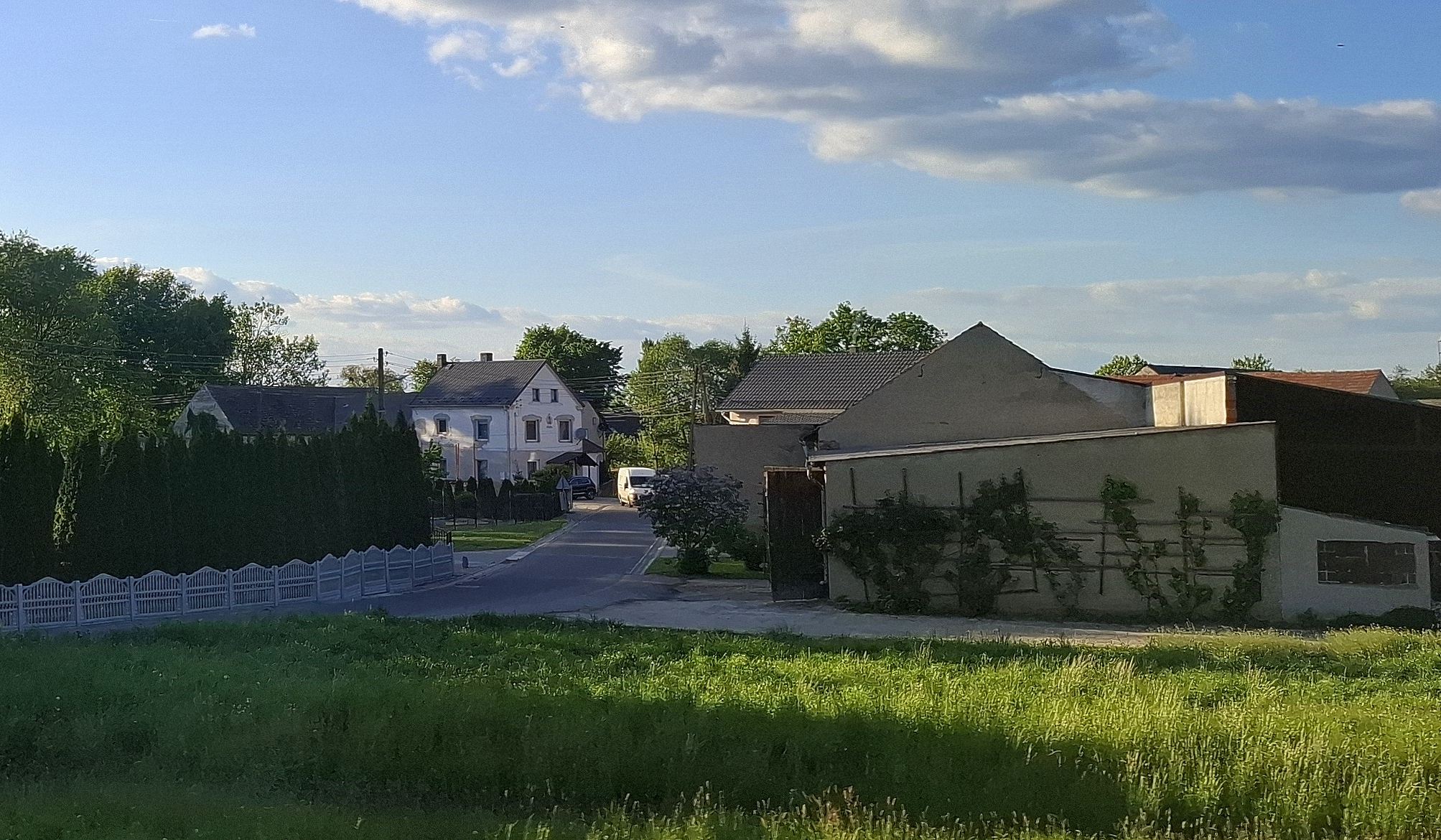

- Location within Poland
- Coordinates: 50°20′01″N 17°49′51″E
- Country: Poland
- Voivodeship: Opole
- County: Prudnik
- Gmina: Głogówek
- Time zone: UTC+1 (CET)
  - Summer (DST): UTC+2
- Area code: +4877
- Vehicle registration: OPR

Kolonia is a village in the administrative district of Gmina Głogówek, within Prudnik County, Opole Voivodeship, south-western Poland. It is situated in the historical region of Prudnik Land.
