= Góreczno =

Góreczno Stroków
- Village
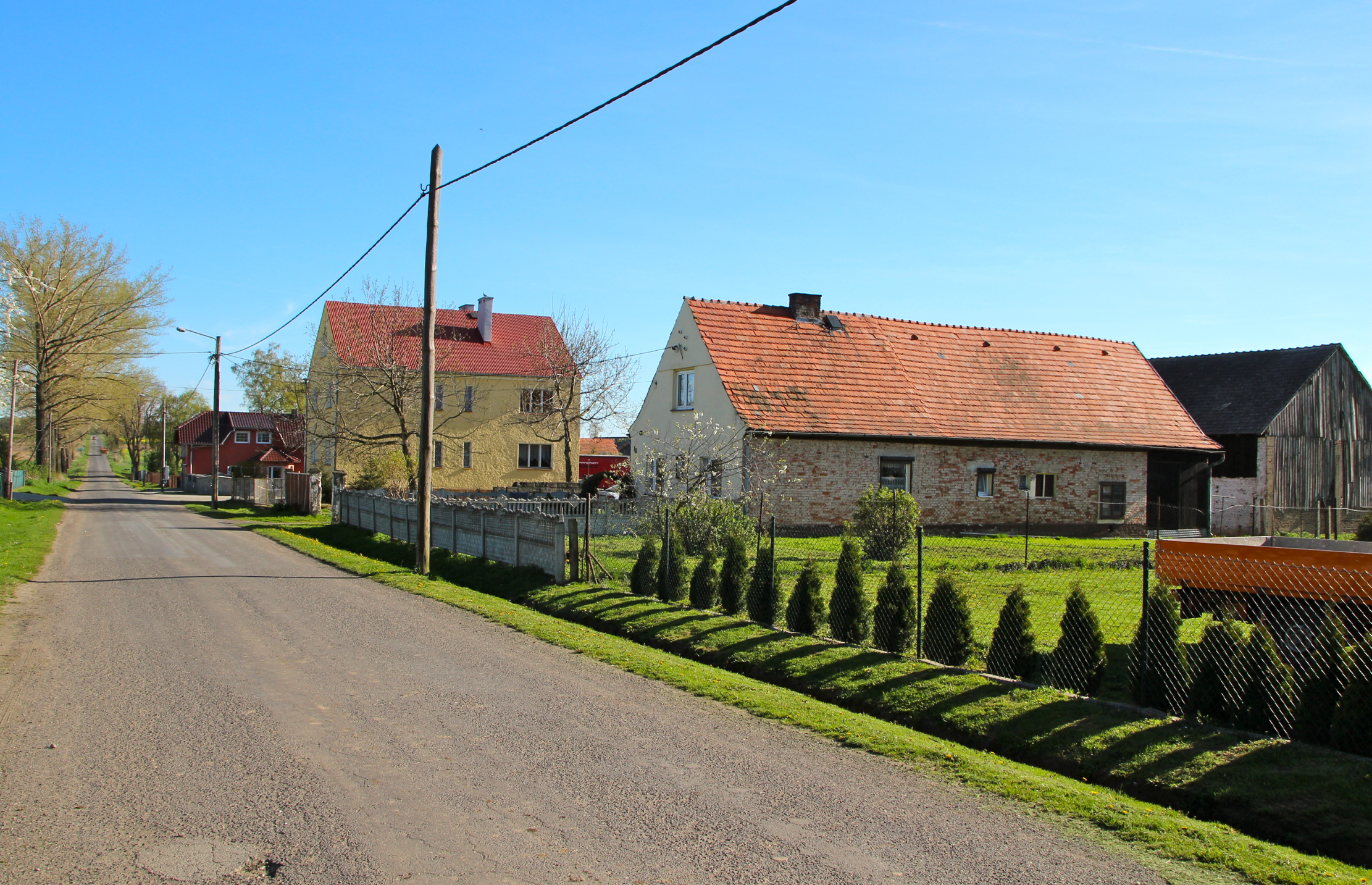

- Location within Poland
- Coordinates: 50°18′18″N 17°51′54″E
- Country: Poland
- Voivodeship: Opole
- County: Prudnik
- Gmina: Głogówek

Population (2021)
  - Total: 51
- Time zone: UTC+1 (CET)
  - Summer (DST): UTC+2
- Postal code: 48-250
- Area code: +4877
- Vehicle registration: OPR

Góreczno [ɡuˈrɛt͡ʂnɔ] (German: Bergvorwerk), additional name: Stroków, is a village in the administrative district of Gmina Głogówek, within Prudnik County, Opole Voivodeship, south-western Poland. It is situated in the historical region of Prudnik Land.

As of 31 December 2021, the village's population numbered 51 inhabitants.

== History ==
The name of this village derived from its location; until 1945 it was called Bergvorwerk, meaning "estate on the mountain". The owners of the estate, amounting to 1000 hectares of arable land, were the von Gaffron-Prittwitz family, descendants of Hussars rewarded by Frederick the Great of Prussia for their loyalty with a large fief. After the death of the last member of the family, Alexander Friedrich von Gaffron-Prittwitz (1845-1923), his widow sold the estate, along with one in nearby Kasimir (Kazimierz). The land was then parceled out into a dozen large farms, including one belonging to Alois Dambon of nearby Roschowitzwald (Roszowicki Las). In the 1930s a waterworks for Oberglogau (Głogówek) was built in the town. There is also a Neolithic archeological site in the town.

After the defeat of Nazi Germany in World War II in 1945, the village became again part of Poland, initially under the name Stroków, and then renamed again to Góreczno.

== Demographics ==
The village is inhabited by immigrant population, resettled from Eastern Borderlands to Silesia as a result of the expulsions of Poles following the Second World War.
