= Szonów =

- Village
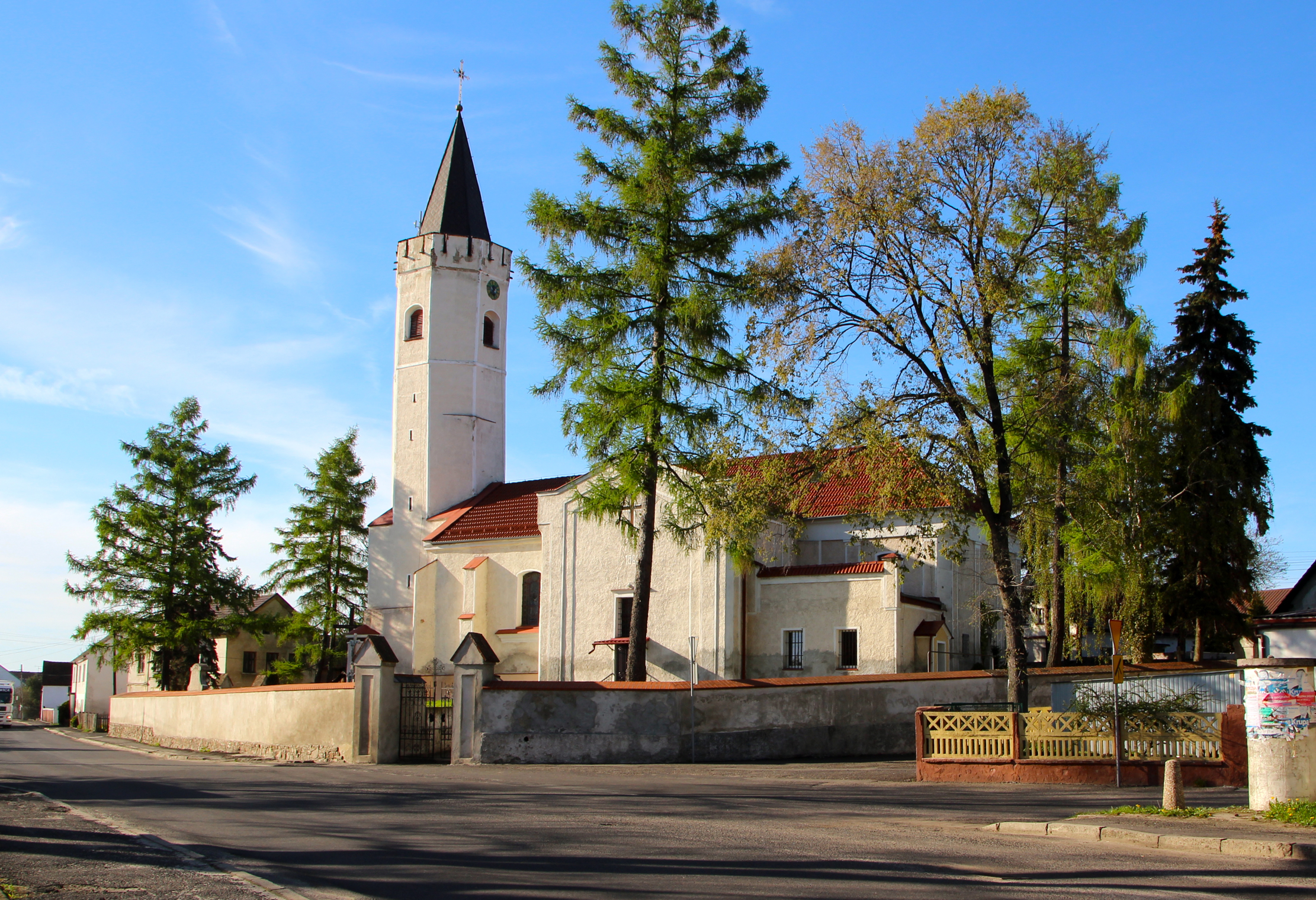

- Location within Poland
- Coordinates: 50°18′10″N 17°50′32″E
- Country: Poland
- Voivodeship: Opole
- County: Prudnik
- Gmina: Głogówek
- Time zone: UTC+1 (CET)
  - Summer (DST): UTC+2 (CEST)
- Vehicle registration: OPR

Szonów [ˈʂɔnuf] (German: Schönau) is a village in the administrative district of Gmina Głogówek, within Prudnik County, Opole Voivodeship, in southern Poland, close to the Czech border.

Szonów/Schönau was, for many prisoners of war, a stopping place on 'The Long March' during the final months of the Second World War in Europe. About 30,000 Allied PoWs were force-marched westward by the Germans in appalling winter conditions, lasting about four months from January to April 1945. Three Polish citizens were murdered by Nazi Germany in the village during the war.

== See also ==
- Prudnik Land
