= Wierzch =

Wierzch Deutsch Müllmen
- Village
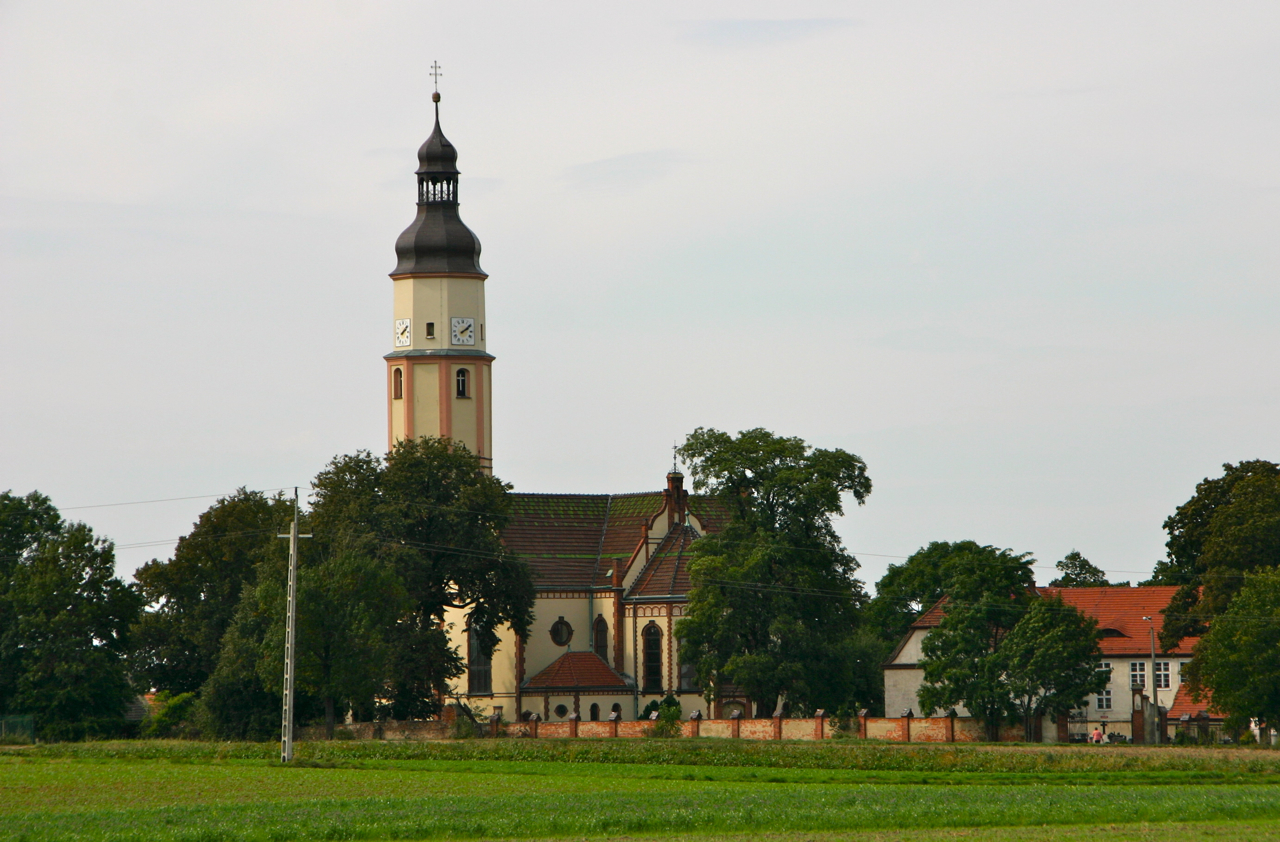
- Saint Lawrence church in Wierzch

- Location within Poland
- Coordinates: 50°21′13″N 17°46′43″E
- Country: Poland
- Voivodeship: Opole
- County: Prudnik
- Gmina: Głogówek
- First mentioned: 1217
- Time zone: UTC+1 (CET)
  - Summer (DST): UTC+2 (CEST)
- Vehicle registration: OPR

Wierzch ([vjɛʂx], additional name in German: Deutsch Müllmen) is a village in the administrative district of Gmina Głogówek, within Prudnik County, Opole Voivodeship, in southern Poland, close to the Czech border. It is located in the Prudnik Land within the historic region of Upper Silesia.

== Etymology and history ==
The name is of Polish origin, with wierzch meaning "summit" or "peak". The earliest record of the village comes from 1217.

In 1844, the village had a population of 652.

Since 2009, in addition to the official Polish language, German has also been recognized as an additional secondary language.
