= Gmina Głogówek =

Gmina Głogówek Głogówek Commune
- Gmina
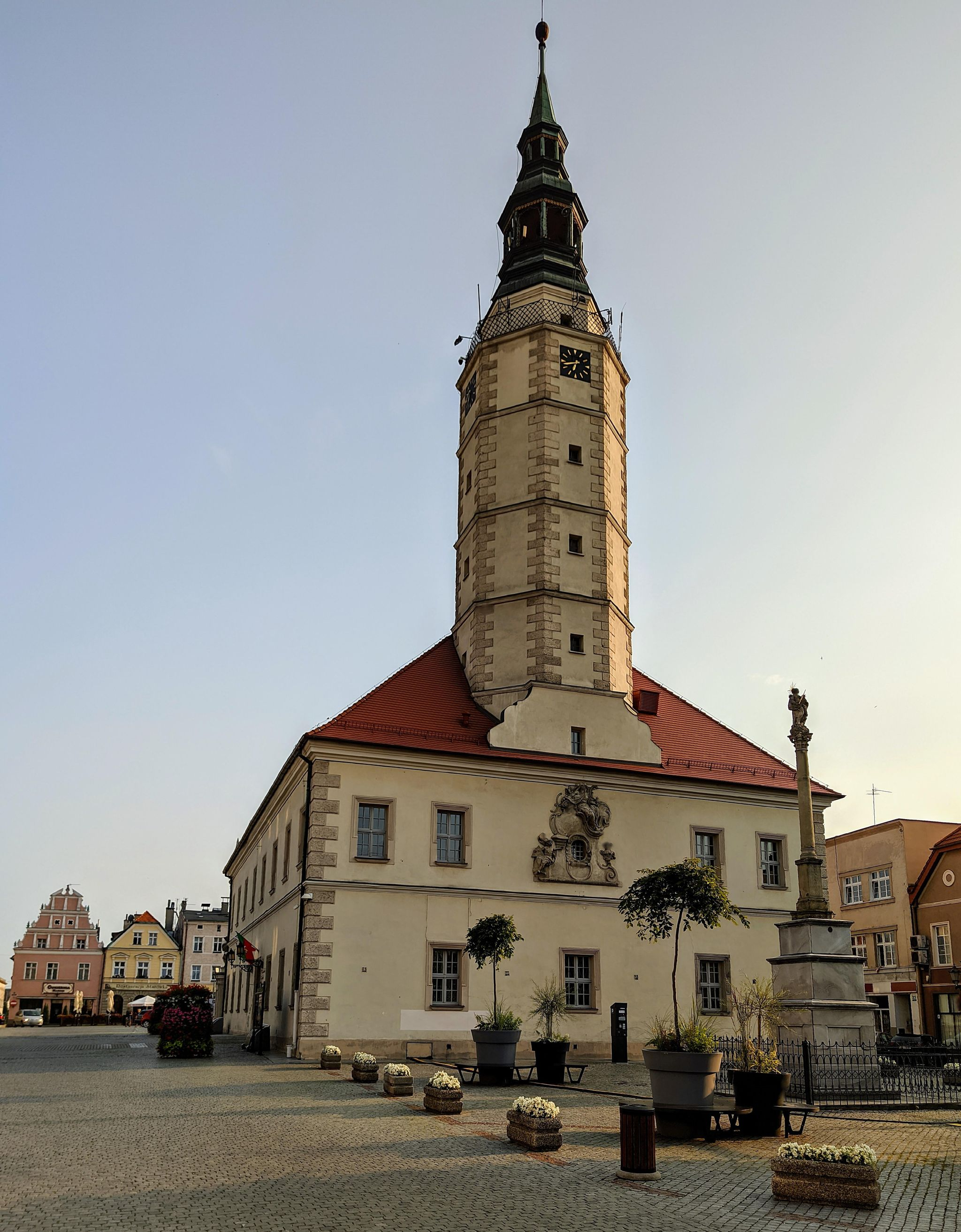
- Town Hall in Głogówek, seat of the gmina office

- Flag Coat of arms
- Interactive map of Gmina Głogówek
- Coordinates (Głogówek): 50°20′38″N 17°52′2″E
- Country: Poland
- Voivodeship: Opole
- County: Prudnik
- Seat: Głogówek

Area
  - Total: 170.06 km^{2} (65.66 sq mi)

Population
  - Total: 13,258
  - Density: 77.961/km^{2} (201.92/sq mi)
  - Urban: 5,592
  - Rural: 7,666
- Time zone: UTC+1 (CET)
  - Summer (DST): UTC+2 (CEST)
- Vehicle registration: OPR
- Website: http://www.glogowek.pl

Gmina Głogówek (German: Gemeinde Oberglogau) is an urban-rural gmina (administrative district) in Prudnik County, Opole Voivodeship, in southern Poland, on the Czech border in Upper Silesia. Its seat is the town of Głogówek (Oberglogau), which lies approximately 21 kilometres (13 mi) east of Prudnik and 37 km (23 mi) south of the regional capital Opole.

The gmina covers an area of 170.06 square kilometres (65.7 sq mi), and as of 2019, its total population was 13,258. Since 2009, in addition to the official Polish language, German has also been recognized as an additional secondary language.

== Villages ==
Apart from the town of Głogówek, the gmina contains villages and settlements of:

- Anachów
- Biedrzychowice
- Błażejowice Dolne
- But
- Chmielnik
- Chudoba
- Ciesznów
- Damasko
- Dzierżysławice
- Golczowice
- Góreczno
- Hojnowice
- Kapełków
- Kazimierz
- Kierpień
- Kolonia
- Korea
- Leśnik
- Malkowice
- Marianków
- Mikulsko
- Mionów
- Młodziejowice
- Mochów
- Mucków
- Nowe Kotkowice
- Racławice Śląskie
- Rzepcze
- Stare Kotkowice
- Sysłów
- Szelonka
- Szonów
- Tomice
- Twardawa
- Wierzch
- Wróblin
- Wyszków
- Zawada
- Zwiastowice

== Demographics ==
As of 31 December 2010, the commune had 14,013 inhabitants. At the time of the census of 2002, the commune had 15,106 inhabitants. Of these, 10,451 (69.1%) declared the Polish nationality; 3,757 persons (24.8%) declared the German nationality; and 219 (1.4%) with the non-recognized Silesian nationality. 679 inhabitants (4.4%) declared no nationality.

== Neighbouring gminas ==
Gmina Głogówek is bordered by the communes of Biała, Głubczyce, Krapkowice, Lubrza, Pawłowiczki, Reńska Wieś, Strzeleczki and Walce. It also borders the Czech Republic.

== Twin towns – sister cities ==
Gmina Głogówek is twinned with:

- Rietberg, Germany
- Vrbno pod Pradědem, Czech Republic
