= Szelonka =

- Village
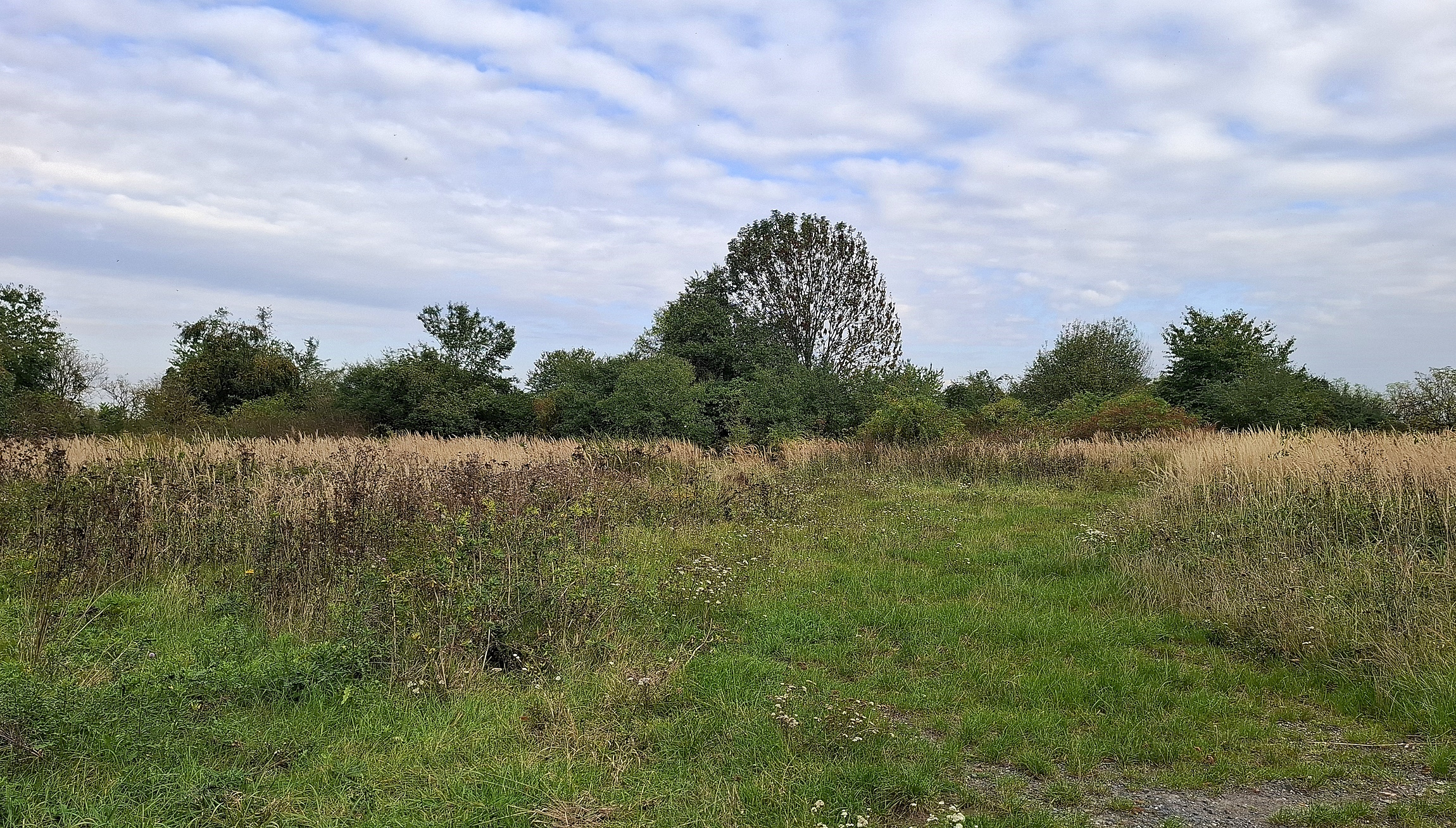

- Location within Poland
- Coordinates: 50°21′18″N 17°57′04″E
- Country: Poland
- Voivodeship: Opole
- County: Prudnik
- Gmina: Głogówek
- Time zone: UTC+1 (CET)
  - Summer (DST): UTC+2
- Area code: +4877
- Vehicle registration: OPR

Szelonka (German: Neuvorwerk) is a village in the administrative district of Gmina Głogówek, within Prudnik County, Opole Voivodeship, south-western Poland. It is situated in the historical region of Prudnik Land. The village is uninhabited.

The village was known as Neuvorwerk in German. The name Szelonka was derived from a Silesian word szelōntać (to shake).
