= Mikulsko =

- Village
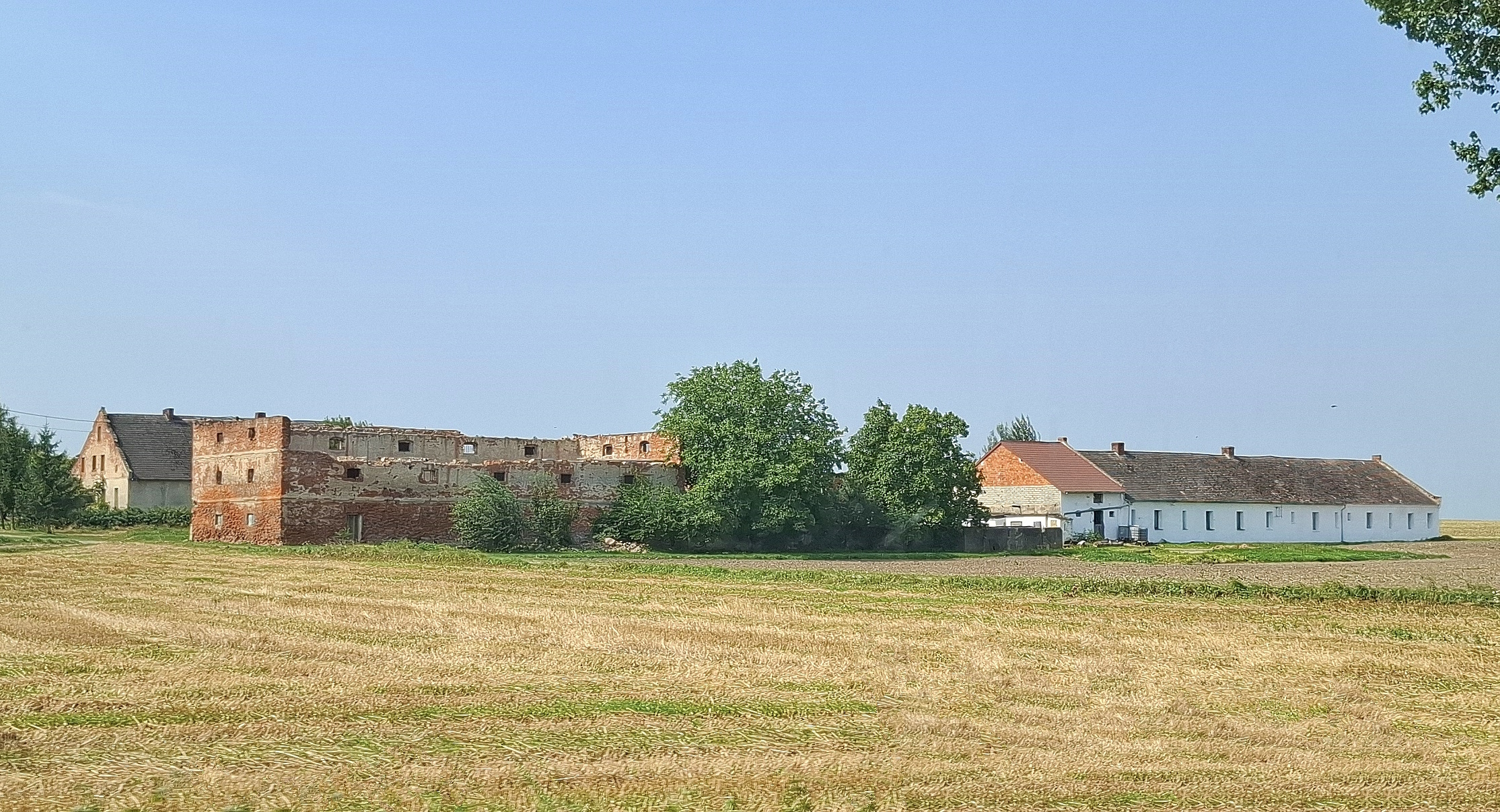

- Location within Poland
- Coordinates: 50°20′09″N 17°57′59″E
- Country: Poland
- Voivodeship: Opole
- County: Prudnik
- Gmina: Głogówek

Mikulsko is a village in the administrative district of Gmina Głogówek, within Prudnik County, Opole Voivodeship, in south-western Poland.
