= Korea, Prudnik County =

Korea
- Village
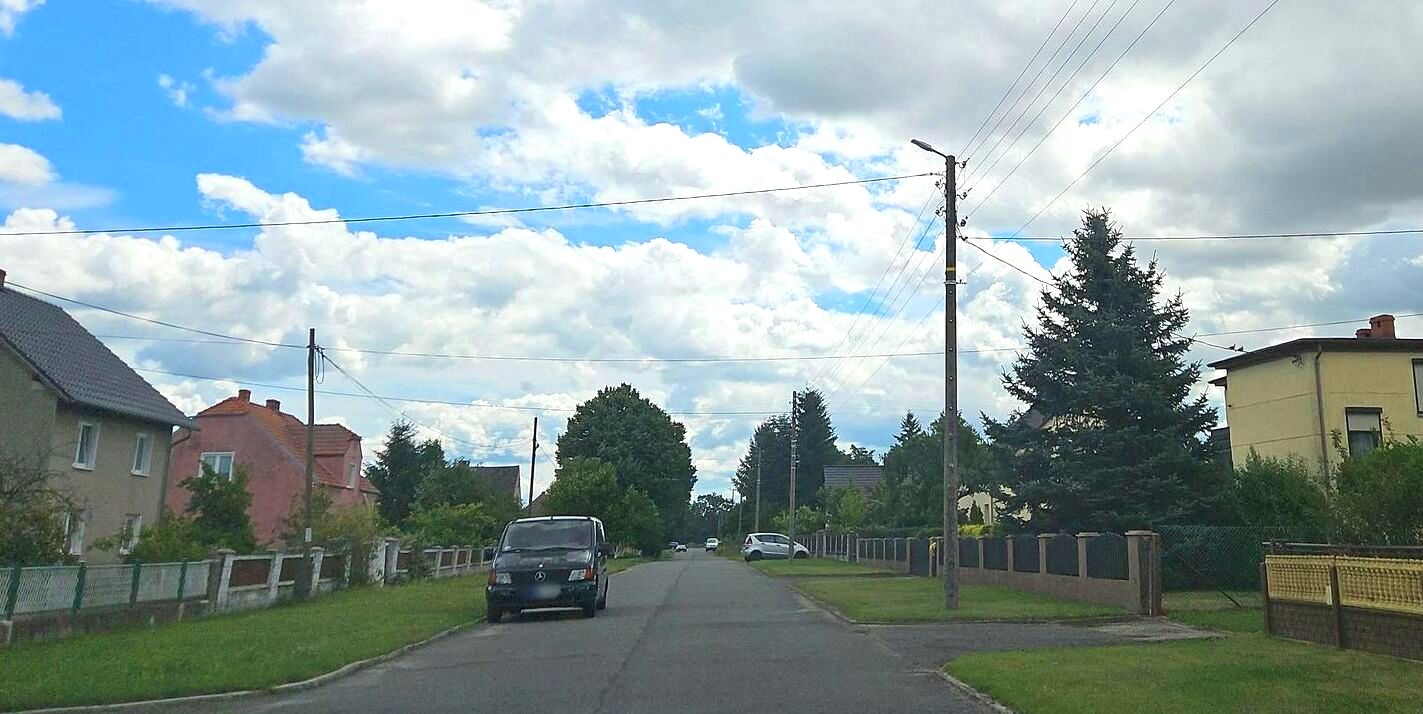

- Location within Poland
- Coordinates: 50°20′56″N 18°00′37″E
- Country: Poland
- Voivodeship: Opole
- County: Prudnik
- Gmina: Głogówek
- Established: 20th century
- Time zone: UTC+1 (CET)
  - Summer (DST): UTC+2
- Area code: +4877
- Vehicle registration: OPR

Korea is a village in the administrative district of Gmina Głogówek, within Prudnik County, Opole Voivodeship, in southern Poland. It is situated in the historical region of Prudnik Land in Upper Silesia.

The village was established in the beginning of the 20th century.
