= Julius Zupitza =

German philologist (1844–1895)

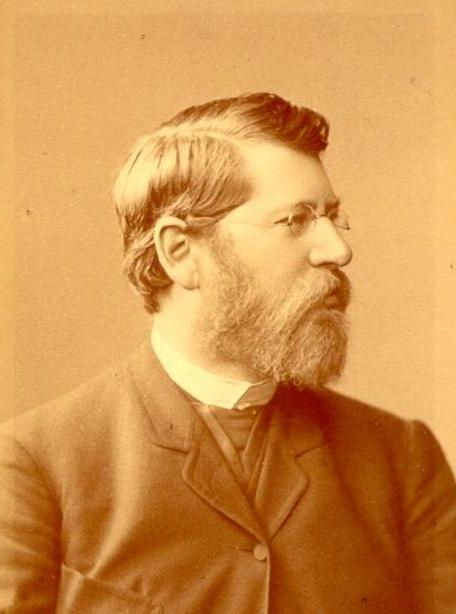
- Born: 4 January 1844; Kerpen, Upper Silesia
- Died: 6 July 1895 (aged 51); Berlin, Germany

Academic work
- Discipline: Philology
- Sub-discipline: English philology
- Institutions: University of Vienna; Friedrich Wilhelm University
- Doctoral students: Arthur Napier

Julius Zupitza (4 January 1844 in Kerpen, Upper Silesia – 6 July 1895 in Berlin) was a German philologist and one of the founders of English philology in Germany.

== Biography ==
Zupitza was the son of Major Andreas Zupitza and his wife, Adelheid, née Albrecht. He received his Gymnasium education in Oppeln.

== Academic career ==
Zupitza studied classical, Germanic, and Romance philology and Sanskrit at the University of Breslau and the University of Berlin, working with Friedrich Pfeiffer, Ottomar Behnsch, Heinrich Rückert, Karl Müllenhoff, August Boeckh, and Moritz Haupt. He received his doctoral degree in 1865 in Berlin and his postdoctoral degree (habilitation) in 1869 in Breslau. After a short appointment at the University of Vienna in the area of Northern Germanic languages, he was appointed first professor and chair of English philology at the prestigious University of Berlin. He remained in this position until he died of a stroke in 1895. In 1893, he received an honorary doctoral degree from the University of Cambridge.

== Selected publications ==
- Einführung in das Studium des mittelhochdeutschen. Zum Selbstunterricht für jeden gebildeten (Oppeln, 1868) (GB)
- Zur Literaturgeschichte des Guy von Warwick (Wien, 1873) (GB)
- Ed., The Romance of Guy of Warwick. The second or 15th-century Version (1875–1876)
- Ed., General Prologue to the Canterbury Tales (1882).
- Ed., Beowulf. Autotypes of the unique Cotton MS. Vitellius A XV in the British Museum (London: Trübner, 1882).
- Ed., Cynewulfs Elene mit einem Glossar (1877).
- Ed., Ælfrics Grammatik und Glossar (1880).
- Ed., Guy of Warwick (1883).
- Ed., The Pardoner's Prologue and Tale (1890).

== See also ==
- Deutsche Shakespeare-Gesellschaft
- Johannes Hoops
- Hugo Gering
