= Tomice, Opole Voivodeship =

Tomice
- Village
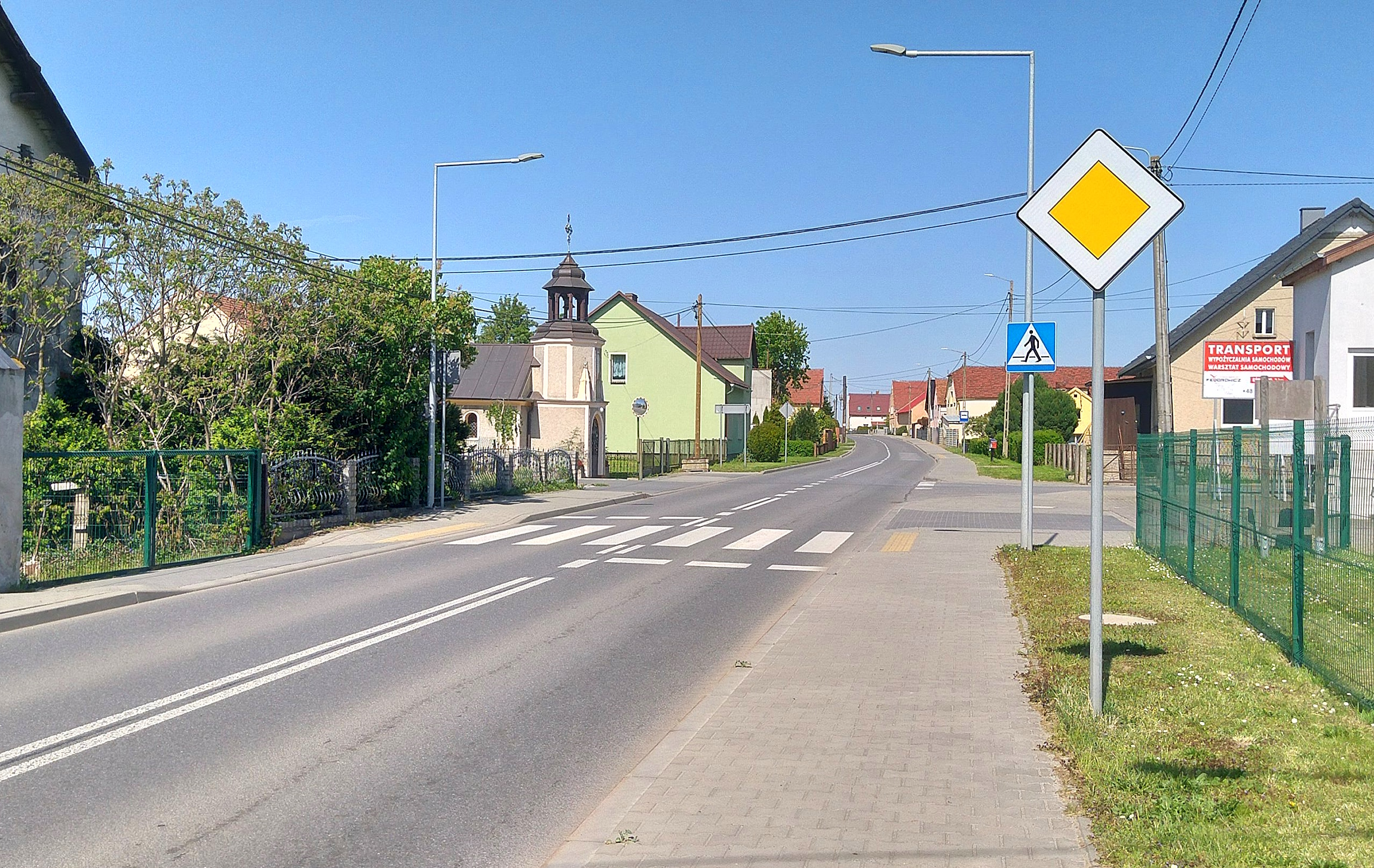

- Location within Poland
- Coordinates: 50°19′5″N 17°50′54″E
- Country: Poland
- Voivodeship: Opole
- County: Prudnik
- Gmina: Głogówek
- Population: 114

Tomice [tɔˈmit͡sɛ] (German: Thomnitz) is a village in the administrative district of Gmina Głogówek, within Prudnik County, Opole Voivodeship, in south-western Poland, close to the Czech border.

== See also ==
- Prudnik Land
