= Wyszków, Opole Voivodeship =

Wyszków
- Village
- Location within Poland
- Coordinates: 50°18′54″N 17°55′58″E
- Country: Poland
- Voivodeship: Opole
- County: Prudnik
- Gmina: Głogówek

Wyszków (German: Probstberg) is a village in the administrative district of Gmina Głogówek, within Prudnik County, Opole Voivodeship, in south-western Poland.
