= Sysłów =

Sysłów Syßlau
- Village
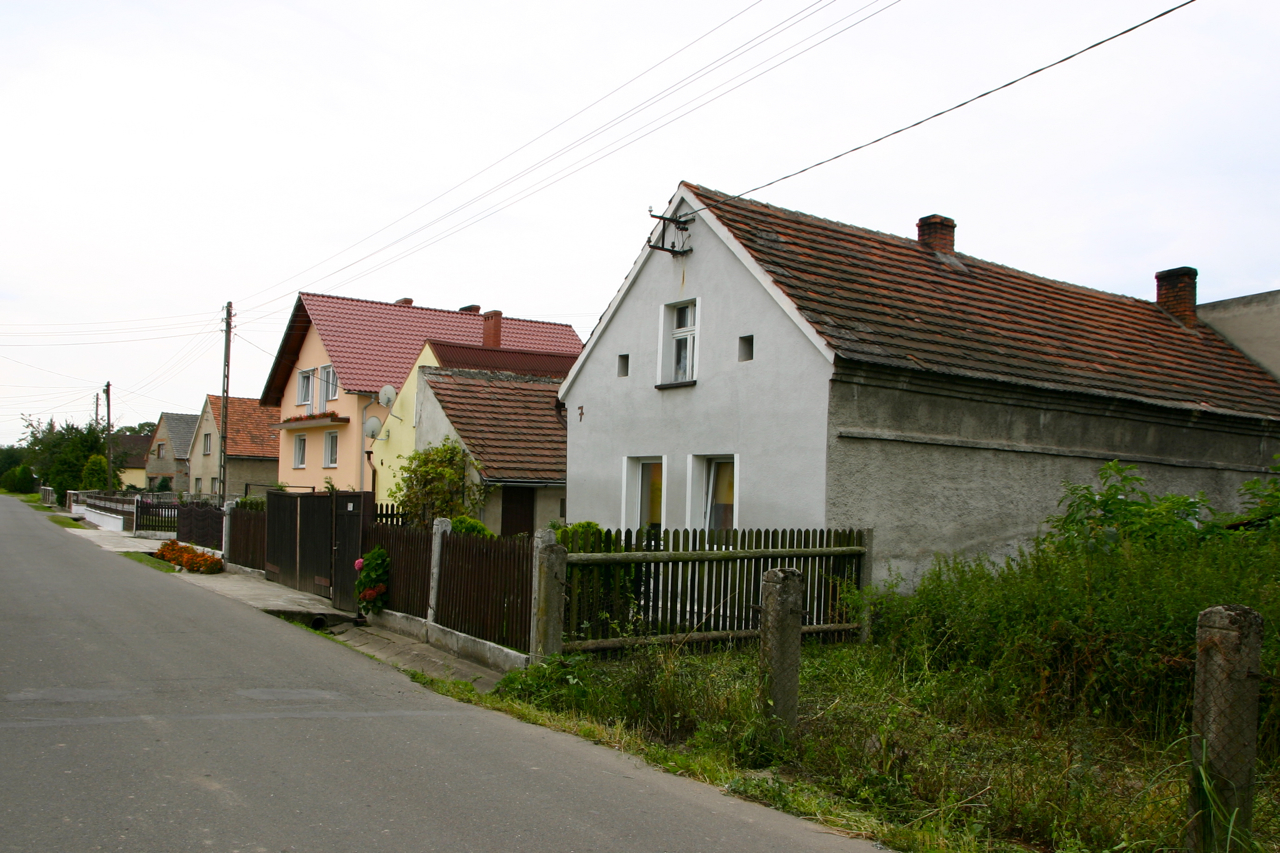

- Location within Poland
- Coordinates: 50°24′26″N 17°48′24″E
- Country: Poland
- Voivodeship: Opole
- County: Prudnik
- Gmina: Głogówek
- Time zone: UTC+1 (CET)
  - Summer (DST): UTC+2 (CEST)
- Vehicle registration: OPR

Sysłów [ˈsɨswuf], additional name in German: Syßlau, is a village in the administrative district of Gmina Głogówek, within Prudnik County, Opole Voivodeship, in southern Poland, close to the Czech border.

Since 2009, in addition to the official Polish language, German has also been recognized as an additional secondary language.

== See also ==
- Prudnik Land
