= Nowe Kotkowice =

Nowe Kotkowice Neu Kuttendorf
- Village
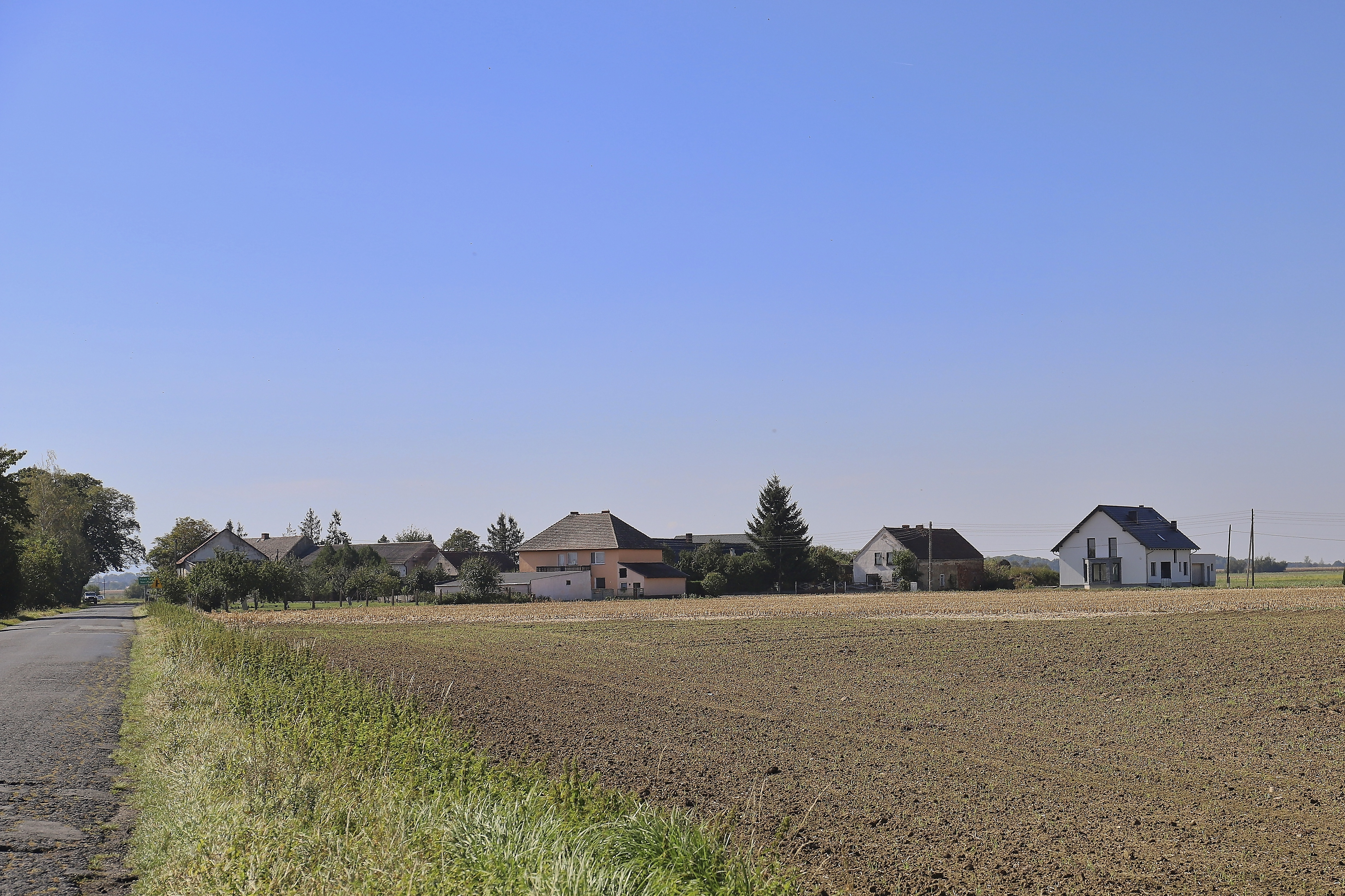

- Location within Poland
- Coordinates: 50°22′19″N 17°54′42″E
- Country: Poland
- Voivodeship: Opole
- County: Prudnik
- Gmina: Głogówek
- Time zone: UTC+1 (CET)
  - Summer (DST): UTC+2 (CEST)
- Vehicle registration: OPR

Nowe Kotkowice [ˈnɔvɛ kɔtkɔˈvit͡sɛ], additional name in German: Neu Kuttendorf, is a village in the administrative district of Gmina Głogówek, within Prudnik County, Opole Voivodeship, in southern Poland, close to the Czech border.

Since 2009, in addition to the official Polish language, German has also been recognized as an additional secondary language.

== See also ==
- Prudnik Land
