= Mucków =

Mucków Mutzkau
- Village
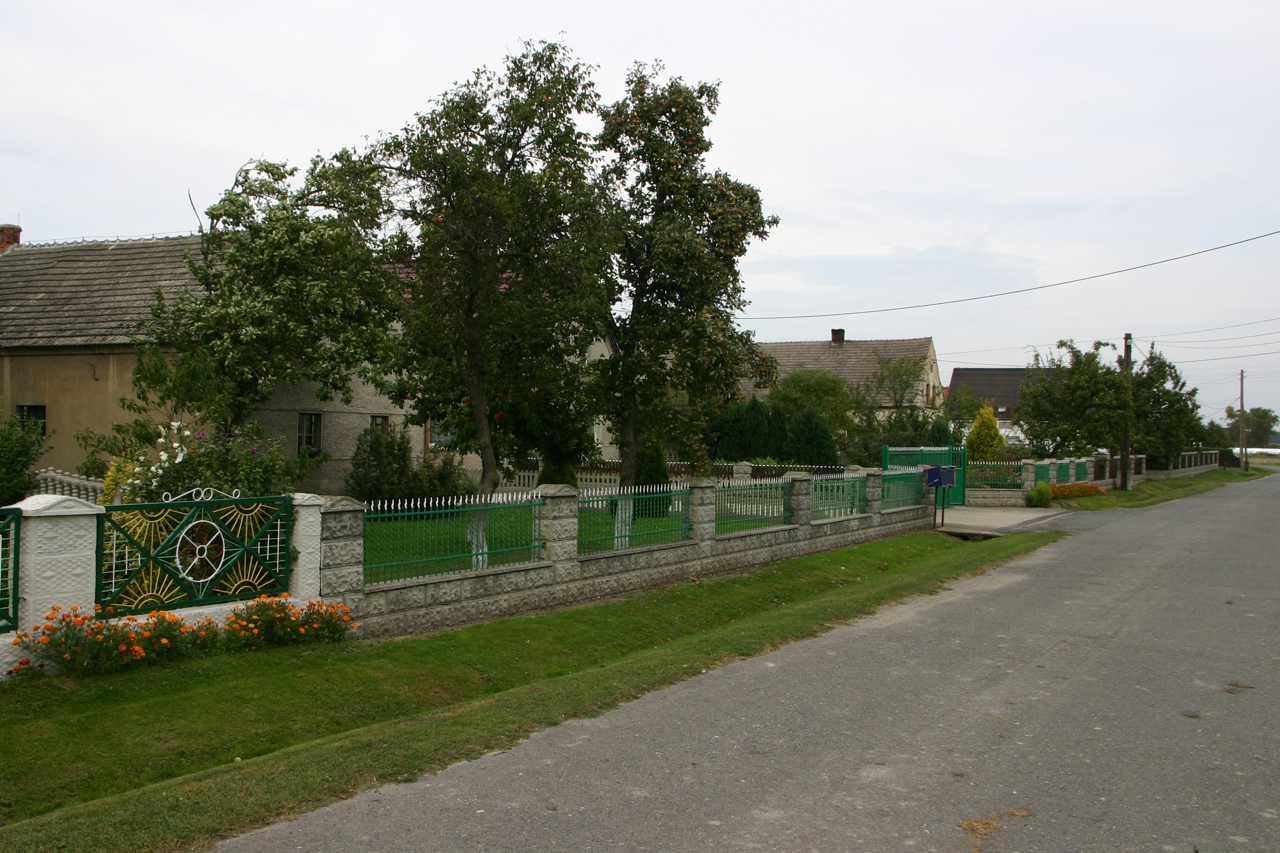

- Location within Poland
- Coordinates: 50°24′26″N 17°48′24″E
- Country: Poland
- Voivodeship: Opole
- County: Prudnik
- Gmina: Głogówek
- Time zone: UTC+1 (CET)
  - Summer (DST): UTC+2 (CEST)
- Vehicle registration: OPR

Mucków [ˈmut͡skuf], additional name in German: Mutzkau, is a village in the administrative district of Gmina Głogówek, within Prudnik County, Opole Voivodeship, in southern Poland, close to the Czech border.

== See also ==
- Prudnik Land
