= Twardawa =

- Village
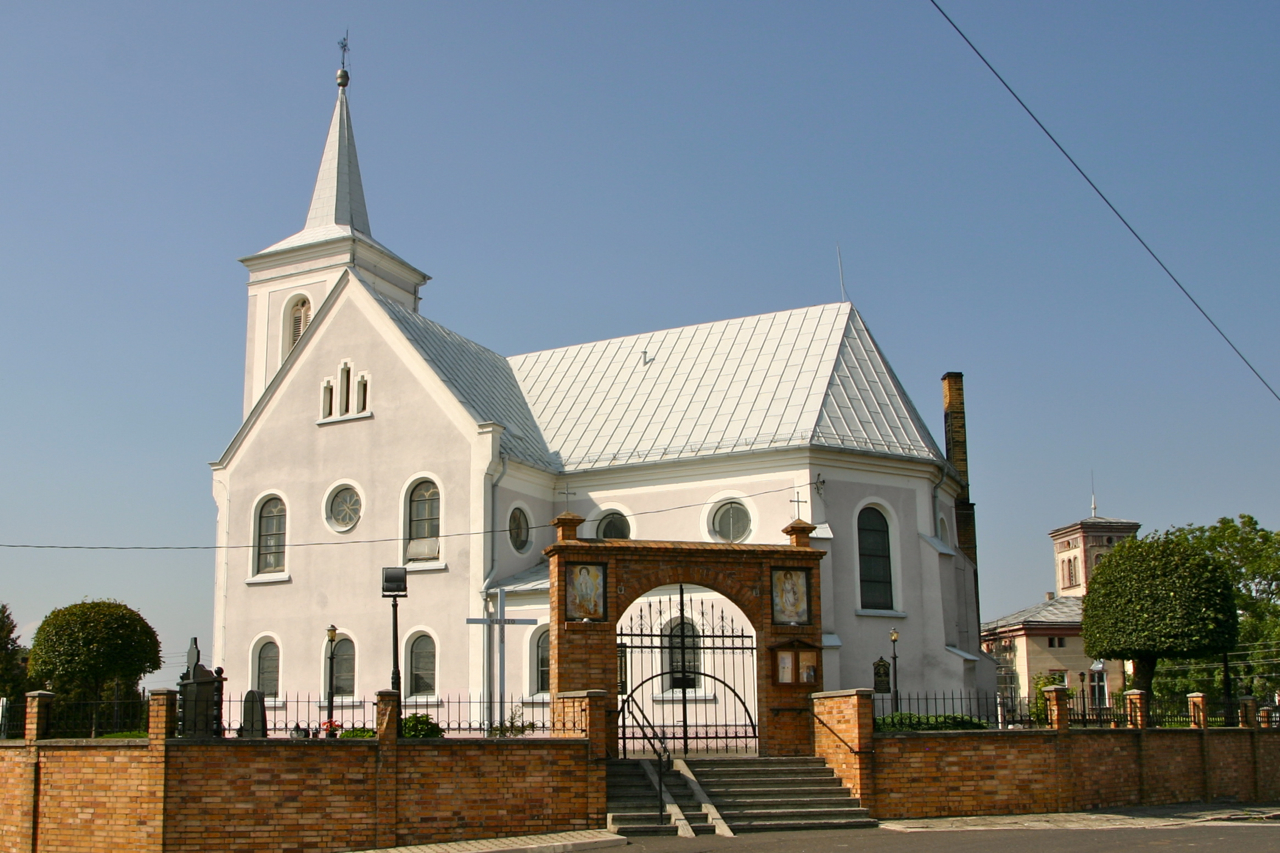
- Saint Margaret church in Twardawa

- Location within Poland
- Coordinates: 50°20′35″N 17°59′22″E
- Country: Poland
- Voivodeship: Opole
- County: Prudnik
- Gmina: Głogówek
- First mentioned: 1224
- Time zone: UTC+1 (CET)
  - Summer (DST): UTC+2 (CEST)
- Vehicle registration: OPR

Twardawa [tfarˈdava] is a village in the administrative district of Gmina Głogówek, in Prudnik County, Opole Voivodeship, in southern Poland, near the Czech border.

== History ==
The village was first mentioned in a document of Bishop of Wrocław Wawrzyniec from 1224, when it was part of fragmented Piast-ruled Poland. Its name is of Polish origin and comes from the word twardy/twarda, which means "hard". The local parish church of Saint Margaret was first mentioned in 1305. Later on, the village was also part of Bohemia (Czechia), Prussia, and Germany. In 1885, Twardawa had a population of 780. In 1936, during a massive Nazi campaign of renaming of placenames, the village was renamed to Hartenau to erase traces of Polish origin.

During World War II, the Germans operated the E255 forced labour subcamp of the Stalag VIII-B/344 prisoner-of-war camp in the village. After the defeat of Germany in the war, in 1945, the village became again part of Poland and its historic name was restored.

== Transport ==
There is a train station in Twardawa, and the Polish National road 40 also passes through the village.

== Notable people ==
- Alfred Bolcek (1954–2016), Polish footballer

== See also ==
- Prudnik Land
