= Kierpień =

Kierpień Kerpen
- Village
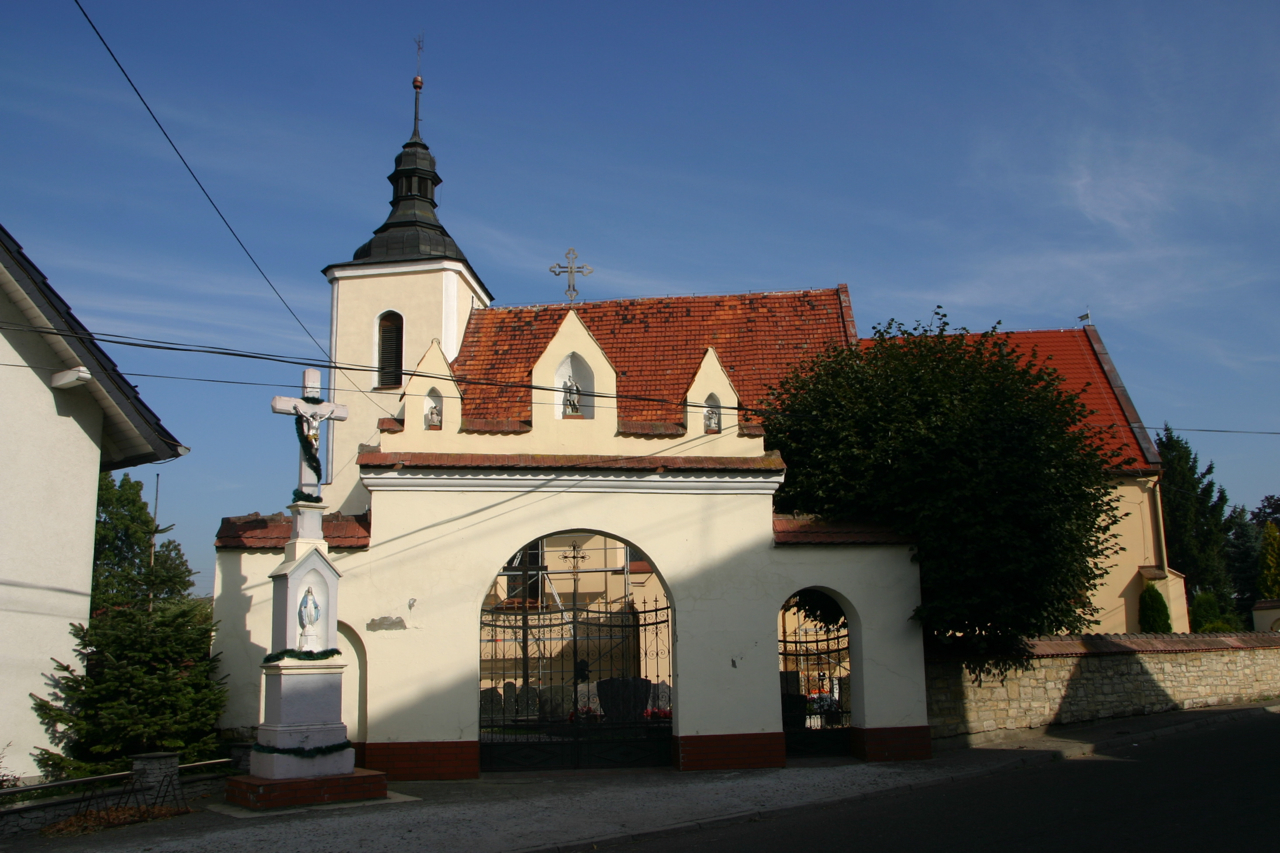
- Church of the Nativity of the Virgin Mary in Kierpień

- Location within Poland
- Coordinates: 50°23′30″N 17°51′21″E
- Country: Poland
- Voivodeship: Opole
- County: Prudnik
- Gmina: Głogówek
- Founded: 13th century
- Time zone: UTC+1 (CET)
  - Summer (DST): UTC+2 (CEST)
- Vehicle registration: OPR

Kierpień ([ˈkʲɛrpjɛɲ], additional name in German: Kerpen) is a village in the administrative district of Gmina Głogówek, within Prudnik County, Opole Voivodeship, in southern Poland, close to the Czech border. It is located in the Prudnik Land within the historic region of Upper Silesia.

== Etymology ==
The name was derived from the word karp, meaning "carp". It was historically known in Polish as Kierpień and Karpno.

== History ==
The village was founded in the 13th century in a territory granted to the Cistercians by Duke Vladislaus I of Opole.

== Notable people ==
- Julius Zupitza (1844–1895), philologist
