= Zawada, Prudnik County =

Zawada Zowade
- Village
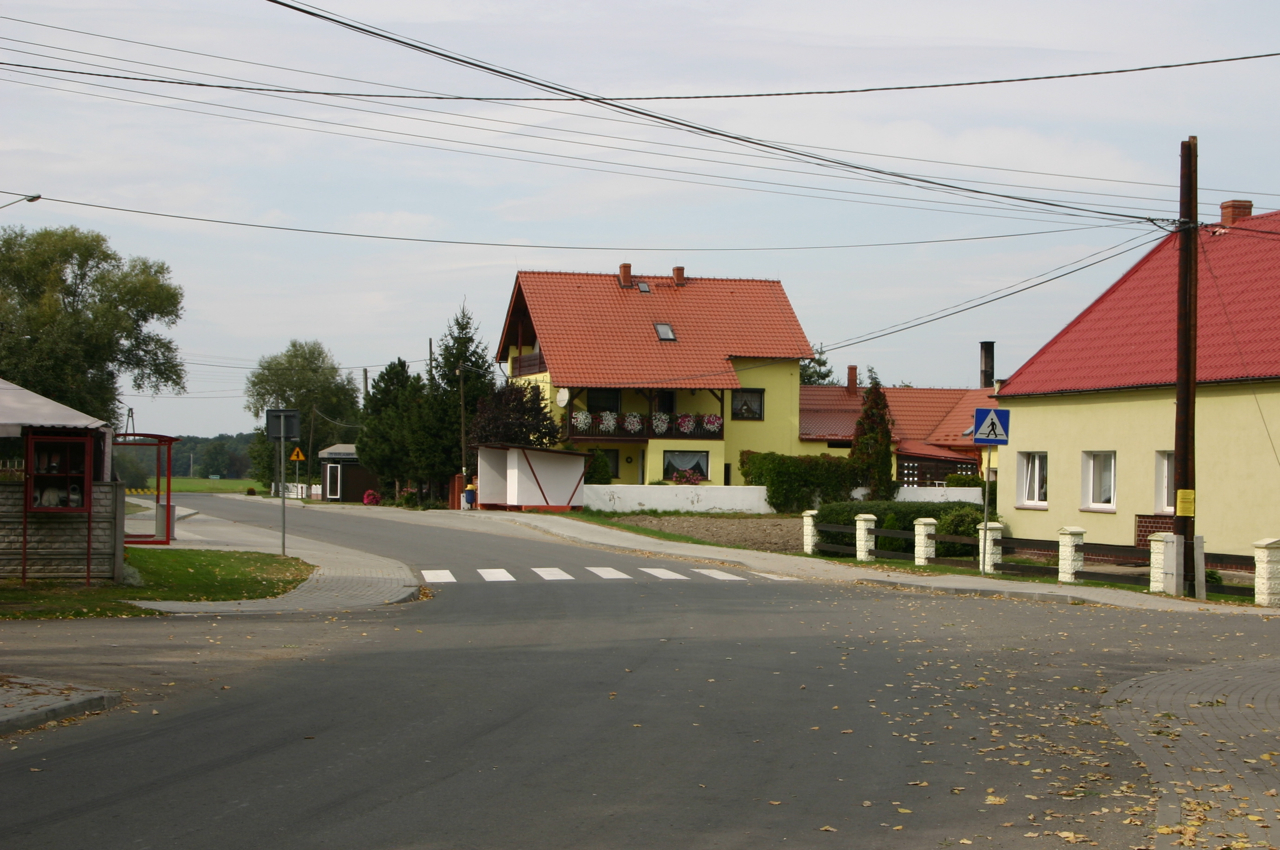

- Location within Poland
- Coordinates: 50°23′58″N 17°49′2″E
- Country: Poland
- Voivodeship: Opole
- County: Prudnik
- Gmina: Głogówek
- Time zone: UTC+1 (CET)
  - Summer (DST): UTC+2 (CEST)
- Vehicle registration: OPR

Zawada [zaˈvada], additional name in German: Zowade, is a village in the administrative district of Gmina Głogówek, within Prudnik County, Opole Voivodeship, in southern Poland, close to the Czech border.

== Etymology ==
The name is of Polish origin, and means "obstacle". Under Nazi Germany, in 1936, the village was renamed Lichten in Oberschlesien to erase traces of Polish origin.

== See also ==
- Prudnik Land
