= Silesian Lowlands =

Coordinates: 50°45′00″N 17°38′00″E

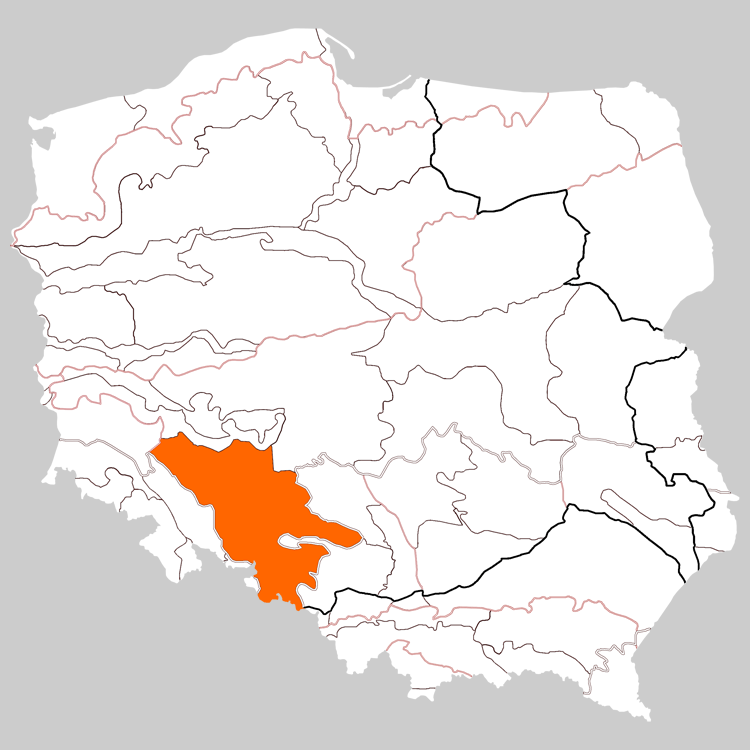
Silesian Lowlands

Silesian Lowlands (or Silesian Plains, Polish: Nizina Śląska, Czech: Slezská nížina, German: Schlesische Niederung) are lowlands located in Silesia, Poland in Central Europe. A small part is located in the Czech Republic. The Silesian ridge runs through northern Silesia from west-northwest to east-southeast and adjoins the Polish mountains in Greater Poland, at the origin of the Ozimek. Its average width is 45 km and its length is around 200 km, with the Glogau Valley in the north and the Wrocław Valley in the south. It is part of the Central European Plain. Silesian Lowlands is a physical-geographical macroregion. It is the warmest region in Poland.

== Geomorphological mesoregions ==
- Oleśnica Plain (Polish: Równina Oleśnicka)
- Racibórz Basin (Polish: Kotlina Raciborska)
- Głubczyce Plateau / Opava Hilly Land (Polish: Płaskowyż Głubczycki, Czech: Opavská pahorkatina)
- Opole Plain (Polish: Równina Opolska)
- Niemodlin Plain (Polish: Równina Niemodlińska)

== Major cities and towns ==
Population figures as of 2018

- Wrocław (640,648)
- Opole (128,137)
- Kędzierzyn-Koźle (61,062)
- Opava (55,996)
- Racibórz (54,882)
- Nysa (44,044)
- Oleśnica (37,242)
- Brzeg (35,930)
- Oława (32,927)
- Lubliniec (23,818)
- Kluczbork (23,661)
- Prudnik (21,170)
- Pyskowice (18,456)
- Namysłów (16,490)
- Krapkowice (16,381)
- Jelcz-Laskowice (15,792)

== See also ==
- Silesian Highlands
- Silesian-Lusatian Lowlands
- Silesian Foothills
- Silesian-Moravian Foothills
