= Prudnik Silesian dialect =

Slavic dialect in Poland

- prudnicki dialekt
- Native to: Poland
- Region: Prudnik Land
- Ethnicity: Silesian
- Language family: Indo-European: Balto-Slavic; Slavic; West Slavic; Lechitic; Polish; Silesian; Prudnik Silesian dialect

Language codes
- ISO 639-3: –
- Prudnik dialect within Opole Voivodeship

The Prudnik Silesian dialect (Silesian: prudnicki dialekt, Polish: gwary prudnickie) is a Silesian dialect, spoken in parts of the historical region of Prudnik Land.

The dialect is characterized by:

- lack of mazuration
- vowel breaking
- pronouncing ã in all positions
- mixing of hard and soft stem inflections as an ending: stari (Polish: stary), żywi (Polish: żywy)

Some linguists consider it a dialect of Silesian, some of the Polish language. It is closely related to the Niemodlin dialect.

== Distribution ==
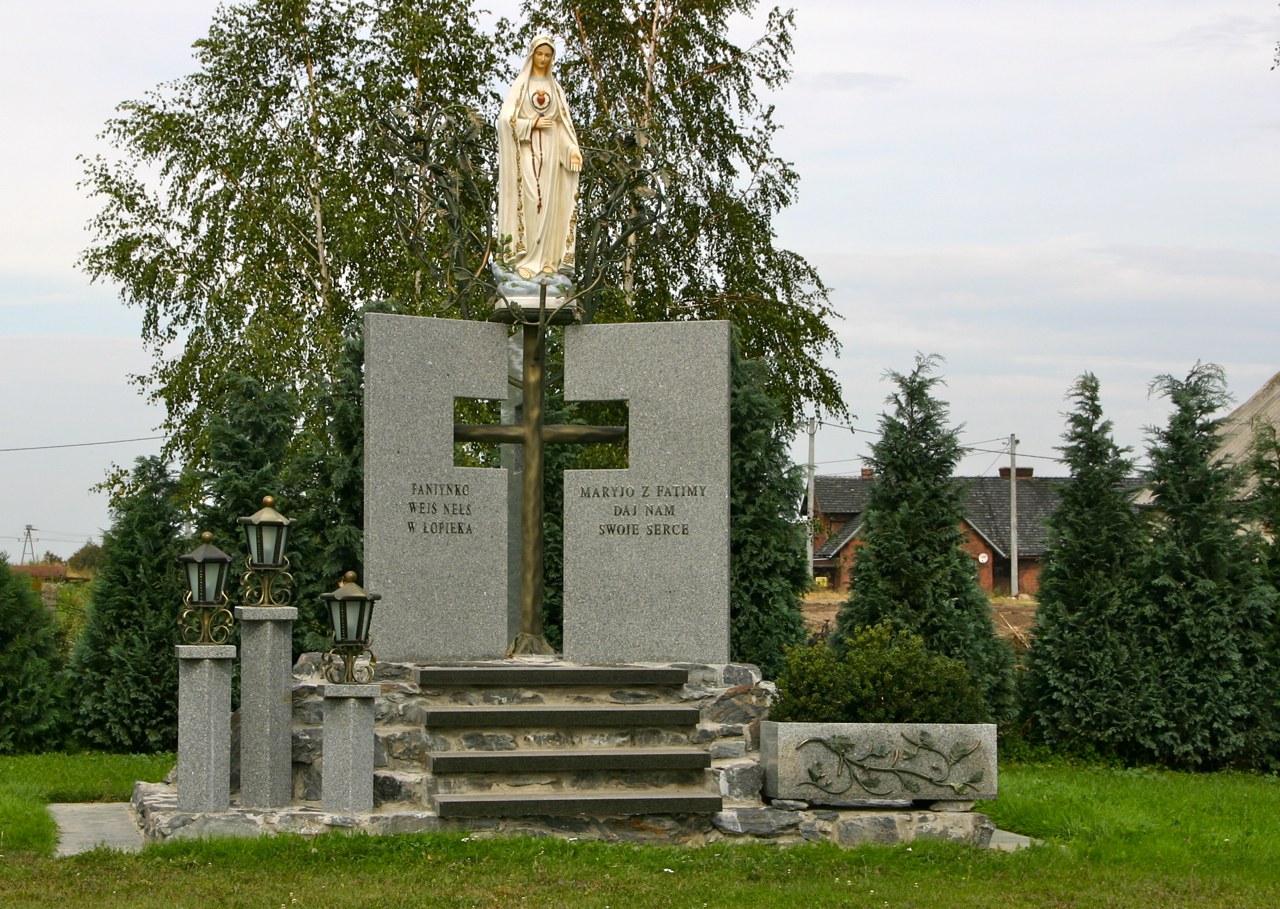
Prudnik dialect on a religious monument in Krobusz: Paniynko wejś nełs w łopieka

The area covered by the Prudnik dialect starts from the east of Prudnik and is limited by the Oder river. It corresponds roughly to the borders of the historical Neustadt O.S. (Prudnik) district. The dialect is spoken in parts of Prudnik County (east and north), Krapkowice County (west), Nysa County (east) and Kędzierzyn-Koźle County (west), in the area of Głogówek, Biała and Strzeleczki. It reaches Krapkowice and Kędzierzyn-Koźle.

Prudnik dialect on a sign in Walce: Przijedźcie zajś!

Several dialect groups exist among the population speaking the Prudnik dialect. The division results from geographical conditions of villages and occupations of the local population.

- Golołki, villages: Gostomia, Solec, Rostkowice, Wilków, Mionów, Wierzch , Olbrachcice, Nowy Browiniec, Browiniec Polski
- Podlesiołki, villages: Moszna, Zielina, Nowa Wieś Prudnicka, Kujawy, Ścigów, Racławiczki, Dziedzice, Smolarnia, Łącznik
- Klocołrzy, villages: But, Czartowice, Golczowice, Mucków, Sysłów, Wawrzyńcowice, Zawada
- Mietlołrzy, villages: Steblów, Dobra, town Strzeleczki
- Kapuściołrzy, villages: Mochów, Błażejowice Dolne, Dzierżysławice
- Kamiyniołrzami, villages: Rzepcze, Kórnica, Komorniki, Pisarzowice, Pietna, Ściborowice, Nowy Dwór Prudnicki
- Karpaciołrzy, village Głogowiec
- Hery, villages: Biedrzychowice, Naczęsławice
- Buchciołrzy, villages: Żużela, Brożec, Stradunia, Mechnica

== Research ==
The Prudnik dialect was scientifically researched by Lucjan Malinowski, Kazimierz Nitsch, Karol Dejna, Stanisław Bąk, Stanisław Rospond, Stanisław Urbańczyk, Feliks Pluta.

== Culture ==
Anna Myszyńska wrote her books in the Prudnik dialect. The dialect was also used by Rafał Urban.

== Example of the dialect ==
Antek i Francek robjyli u dwůch śoduoeúkůw i ńy mjeli co jejś. I smůwjyli se, iže tyn jedyn śoduoeúk moeu na gůře uořechi, a tyn drugi moeu we chlywiku wjepřka. I smůwjyli se tak, iže jedyn půdźe po tygo wjepřka, a drugi po uořechi, a we zwůńicy we kojśćele śe zyjńdům. Francek nabroeu worek uořechůw i čekoeu we kojśćele na Antka, a Antka zuapoeu śoduoeúk na wjepřku. Francek čekoeu we tyj kojśćele na Antka i tam přebjyroeu ty uořechi. Rano uo pjůntyj šeu kojśćelny zwůnić jučšńam i suyšou tam šuščeć. I šeu dů dům i powjedźöu kobjyće, iže tam ńe idźe iś, bo tam kojśćůma řańźi (Kjyrpjyń).
