= Jeleni Dwór =

- Village
- Location within Poland
- Coordinates: 50°30′02″N 17°43′44″E
- Country: Poland
- Voivodeship: Opole
- County: Prudnik
- Gmina: Biała
- Time zone: UTC+1 (CET)
  - Summer (DST): UTC+2
- Area code: +4877
- Vehicle registration: OPR

Jeleni Dwór (German: Rehhof) is a village in the administrative district of Gmina Biała, within Prudnik County, Opole Voivodeship, south-western Poland. It is situated in the historical region of Prudnik Land.

The Chrzelice Transmitter is located in Jeleni Dwór. In 1966, the village's population numbered 9 inhabitants.

== Transport ==
County road number 1270O (Chrzelice—Jeleni Dwór) runs through the village.
