= Kolonia Otocka, Grabina =

Kolonia Otocka
- Village
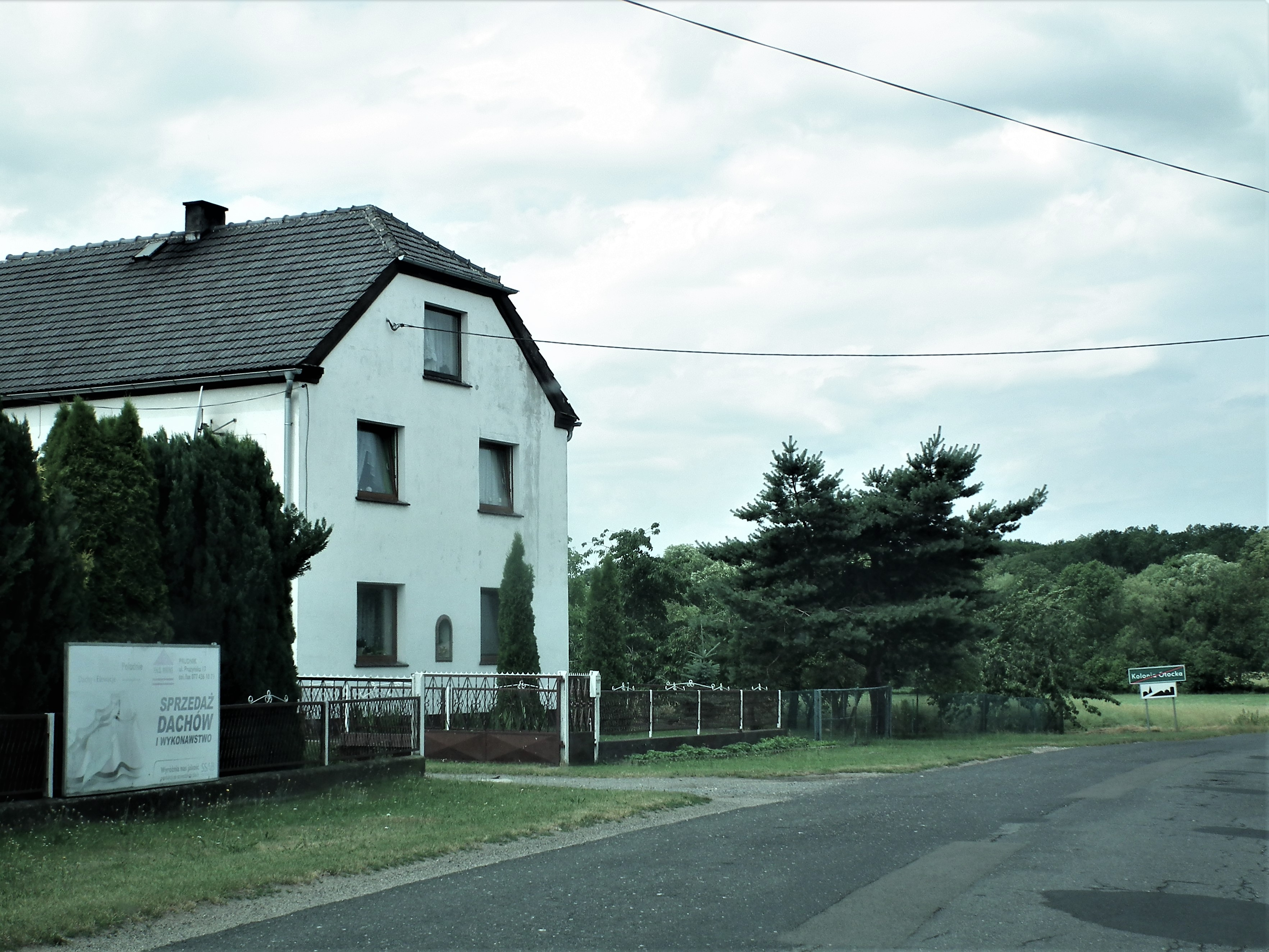

- Location within Poland
- Coordinates: 50°26′18″N 17°37′45″E
- Country: Poland
- Voivodeship: Opole
- County: Prudnik
- Gmina: Biała
- Time zone: UTC+1 (CET)
  - Summer (DST): UTC+2
- Postal code: 48-210
- Area code: +4877
- Vehicle registration: OPR

Kolonia Otocka (German: Kolonie Ottok) is a village in the administrative district of Gmina Biała, within Prudnik County, Opole Voivodeship, south-western Poland. It is situated in the historical region of Prudnik Land.

The National Register of Geographical Names for 2025 classified Kolonia Otocka as a colony (kolonia wsi) of Grabina. It is called Kolonia Grabińska to distinguish it from the nearby village which is also named Kolonia Otocka.

== History ==
The village was established between 1842 and 1845. It was named Kolonie Ottok in German. In 1936, Nazi administration of the German Reich changed the village's name to Auenwalde Kolonie.
