= Cocotte =

Cocotte may refer to:

- French oven, cocotte in French
- Œufs cocotte, French term for shirred eggs
- Montagne Cocotte, mountain in Mauritius
- Cocotte (prostitute), a type of French prostitute
- Cocotte en papier paper fortune teller

== See also ==
- Kokot (disambiguation)
- Kokott (disambiguation)
