= Frącki, Opole Voivodeship =

Frącki Fronzke
- Village
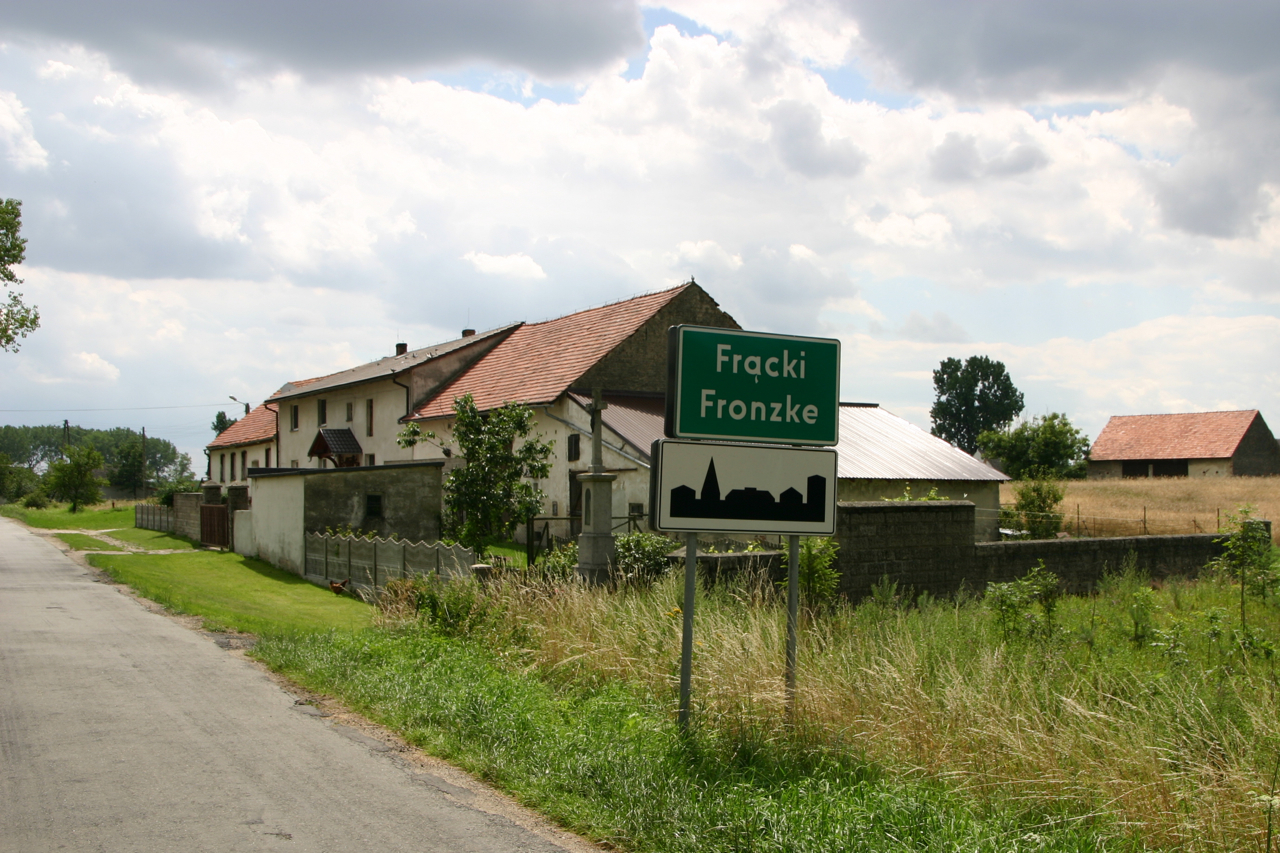

- Location within Poland
- Coordinates: 50°27′20″N 17°41′21″E
- Country: Poland
- Voivodeship: Opole
- County: Prudnik
- Gmina: Biała
- Time zone: UTC+1 (CET)
  - Summer (DST): UTC+2 (CEST)
- Vehicle registration: OPR

Frącki ([ˈfrɔnt͡skʲi], additional name in German: Fronzke) is a settlement, part of the village of Pogórze, in the administrative district of Gmina Biała, within Prudnik County, Opole Voivodeship, in southern Poland.

The name of the village is of Polish origin and comes from the word wrona, which means "crow". Its old Polish forms were Wronza and Fronka.

== See also ==
- Prudnik Land
