= Żabnik, Opole Voivodeship =

Żabnik Ziabnik
- Village
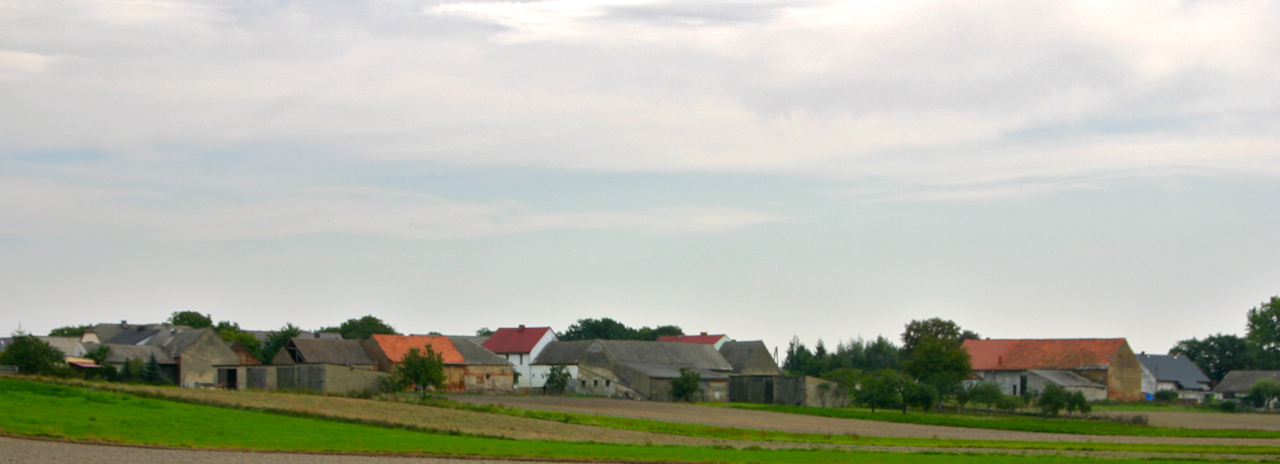

- Location within Poland
- Coordinates: 50°24′36″N 17°44′3″E
- Country: Poland
- Voivodeship: Opole
- County: Prudnik
- Gmina: Biała
- Time zone: UTC+1 (CET)
  - Summer (DST): UTC+2 (CEST)
- Vehicle registration: OPR

Żabnik ([ˈʐabɲik], additional name in German: Ziabnik) is a settlement, part of the village of Krobusz, in the administrative district of Gmina Biała, within Prudnik County, Opole Voivodeship, in southern Poland.

The name of the village is of Polish origin and comes from the word żaba, which means "frog".

== See also ==
- Prudnik Land
