= Kokott =

Kokott may refer to:

- Gothard Kokott (1943–2021), Polish football player
- Heinz Kokott (1900–1976), German general
- Juliane Kokott (born 1957), German EU official
- Lu, a kokott, 1918 Hungarian film

== See also ==
- Cocotte (disambiguation)
- Kokot (disambiguation)
