= Śródlesie =

Śródlesie may refer to the following places:

- Śródlesie, Lubusz Voivodeship (west Poland)
- Śródlesie (Majzlówka)
- Śródlesie (Osada Bud)
- Śródlesie, Podlaskie Voivodeship (north-east Poland)
- Śródlesie, West Pomeranian Voivodeship (north-west Poland)
