= Śmieciak =

- Village
- Location within Poland
- Coordinates: 50°27′18″N 17°40′09″E
- Country: Poland
- Voivodeship: Opole
- County: Prudnik
- Gmina: Biała
- Time zone: UTC+1 (CET)
  - Summer (DST): UTC+2
- Postal code: 48-210
- Area code: +4877
- Vehicle registration: OPR

Śmieciak (German: Schmitschok) is a village in the administrative district of Gmina Biała, within Prudnik County, Opole Voivodeship, south-western Poland. It is situated in the historical region of Prudnik Land.

== Etymology ==
The village was known as Schmitschok in German. In 1935, Nazi administration of the German Reich changed the village's name to Kleinfegern. Following the Second World War, the Polish name Śmieciok was introduced by the Commission for the Determination of Place Names.
