= Kolonia Pogórze =

- Village
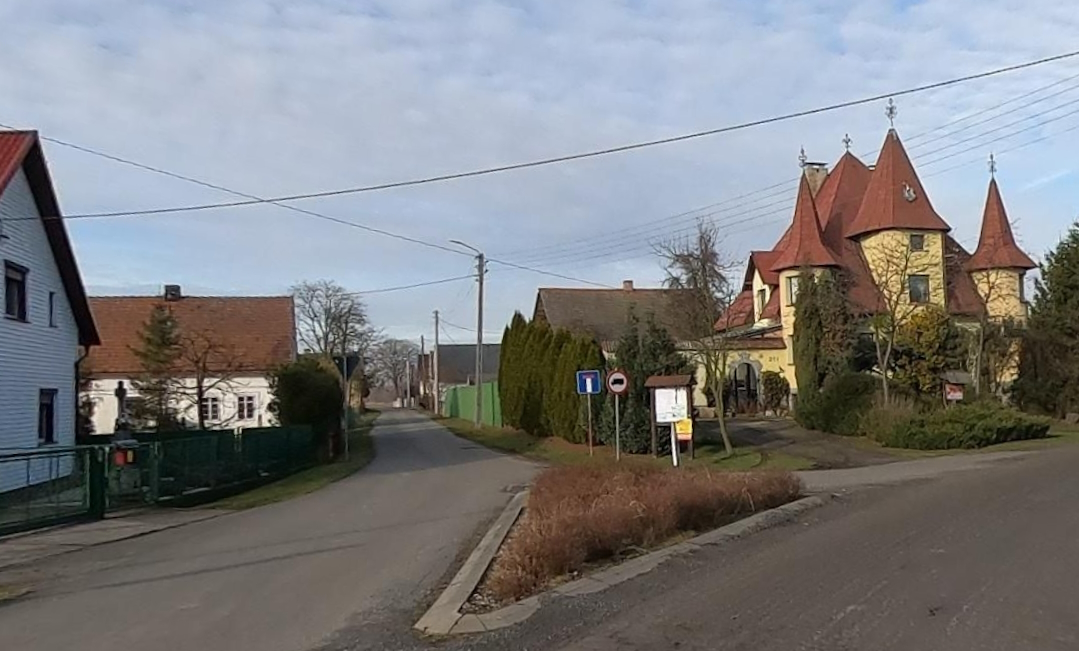

- Location within Poland
- Coordinates: 50°29′09″N 17°41′01″E
- Country: Poland
- Voivodeship: Opole
- County: Prudnik
- Gmina: Biała
- Time zone: UTC+1 (CET)
  - Summer (DST): UTC+2
- Postal code: 48-220
- Area code: +4877
- Vehicle registration: OPR

Kolonia Pogórze (German: Pogosch Kolonie) is a village in the administrative district of Gmina Biała, within Prudnik County, Opole Voivodeship, south-western Poland. It is situated in the historical region of Prudnik Land.

== Etymology ==
The village was known as Pogosch Kolonie and Kolonie Klein Pogosch in German. In 1936, Nazi administration of the German Reich changed the village's name to Brandewalde Kolonie. It is also known as Pogórze Kolonia, Pogórz Kolonia, Kolonia Pogórz, Kolonia Podgórska, and simply as Pogórze.

== History ==
Only a portion of Prudnik County participated in the 1921 Upper Silesia plebiscite, which was supposed to determine ownership of the Province of Upper Silesia between Germany and Poland. Kolonia Pogórze found itself in the eastern part of the county, within the plebiscite area. In the end, the area of Prudnik, along with Kolonia Pogórze, remained in Germany.

Following the Second World War, from March to May 1945, Prudnik County was controlled by the Soviet military commandant's office. On 11 May 1945, it was passed on to the Polish administration. In 1966, there were 55 people living in Kolonia Pogórze.
