= Brzeźnica, Opole Voivodeship =

Brzeźnica Bresnitz
- Village
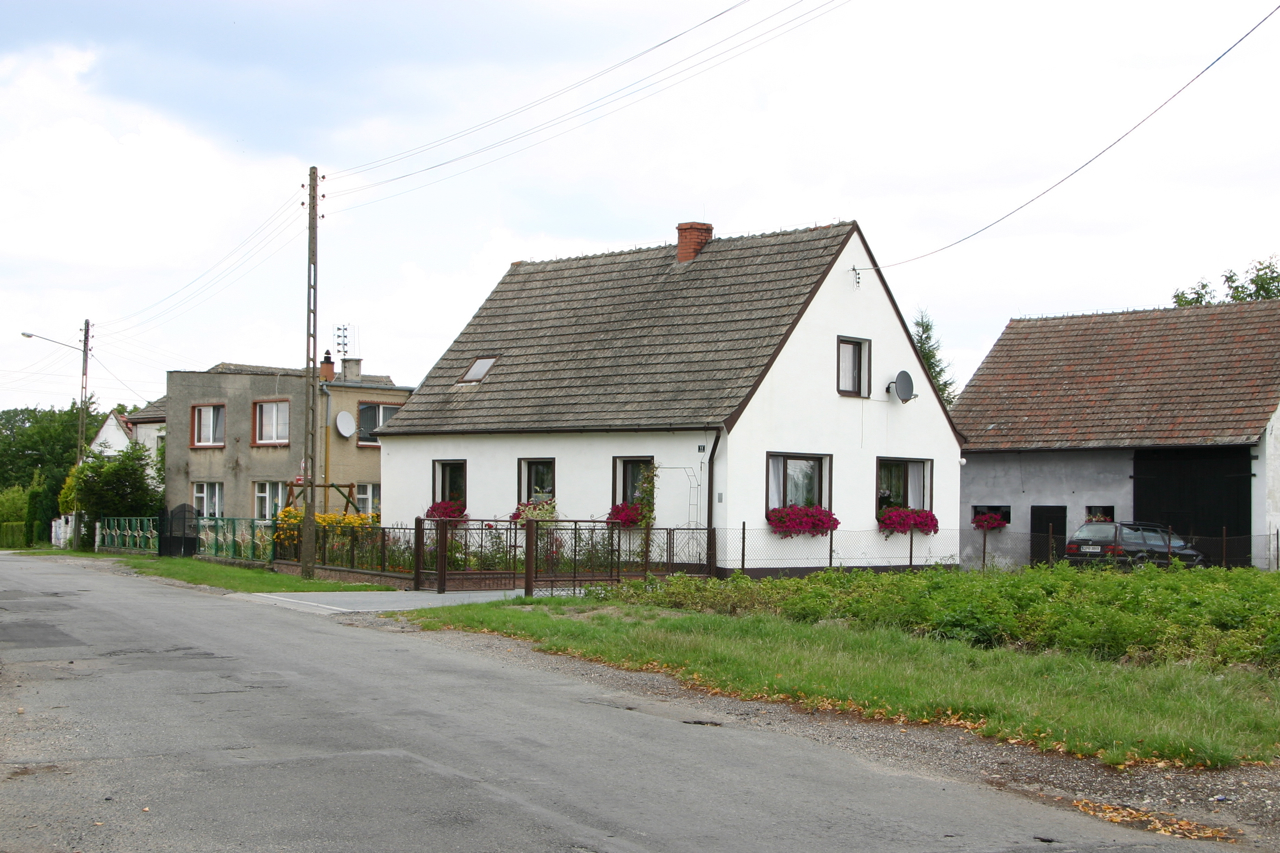
- Brzeźnica in July 2011

- Location within Poland
- Coordinates: 50°26′45″N 17°41′36″E
- Country: Poland
- Voivodeship: Opole
- County: Prudnik
- Gmina: Biała
- Time zone: UTC+1 (CET)
  - Summer (DST): UTC+2 (CEST)
- Vehicle registration: OPR

Brzeźnica ([bʐɛʑˈɲit͡sa], additional name in German: Bresnitz) is a village in the administrative district of Gmina Biała, within Prudnik County, Opole Voivodeship, in south-western Poland.

== See also ==
- Prudnik Land
