= Kolonia Ligocka =

- Village
- Location within Poland
- Coordinates: 50°25′53″N 17°39′46″E
- Country: Poland
- Voivodeship: Opole
- County: Prudnik
- Gmina: Biała
- Time zone: UTC+1 (CET)
  - Summer (DST): UTC+2
- Postal code: 48-210
- Area code: +4877
- Vehicle registration: OPR

Kolonia Ligocka (German: Ellguth Kolonie) is a village in the administrative district of Gmina Biała, within Prudnik County, Opole Voivodeship, south-western Poland. It is situated in the historical region of Prudnik Land.

The village was established between 1842 and 1845. It was named Ellguth Kolonie in German. In 1936, Nazi administration of the German Reich changed the village's name to Freigut. Following the Second World War, the Polish name Kolonia Ligocka was introduced by the Commission for the Determination of Place Names on 2 April 1949.
