= Chrzelice Transmitter =

Facility for FM and TV transmission in Poland

- Location within Poland
- Location: Chrzelice, Prudnik County, Poland
- Mast height: 200-metre-high (660 ft)
- Coordinates: 50°29′43″N 17°43′48″E

Chrzelice Transmitter is a facility for FM and TV-transmission at Chrzelice, Prudnik County in Poland. Chrzelice Transmitter began operations in 1979 and uses as its antenna mast a 200-metre-high (660 ft) guyed mast.

== Transmitted Programmes ==
=== Digital Television MPEG 4 ===
Multiplex	Frequency	Channel Number	Transmission Power
MUX 1	674 MHz	46	100 kW
MUX 2	490 MHz	23	100 kW
MUX 3	578 MHz	34	100 kW

=== FM Radio Programme ===
Program	Frequency	Transmission Power
PR2 Polskie Radio S.A.	88,30 MHz	60 kW
PR3 Polskie Radio S.A.	90,30 MHz	60 kW
PR1 Polskie Radio S.A.	94,50 MHz	10 kW
RMF FM Radio Muzyka Fakty Sp. z o.o.	95,30 MHz	60 kW
Radio Opole Polskie Radio - Regionalna Rozgłośnia w Opolu "Radio Opole" S.A.	103,20 MHz	60 kW

== See also ==
- List of masts
