= Róża, Opole Voivodeship =

Róża
- Village
- Location within Poland
- Coordinates: 50°22′56″N 17°44′01″E
- Country: Poland
- Voivodeship: Opole
- County: Prudnik
- Gmina: Biała
- Time zone: UTC+1 (CET)
  - Summer (DST): UTC+2
- Postal code: 48-210
- Area code: +4877
- Vehicle registration: OPR

Róża [ˈruʐa] (German: Rose) is a village in the administrative district of Gmina Biała, within Prudnik County, Opole Voivodeship, southern Poland. It is situated in the historical region of Prudnik Land in Upper Silesia.

== Etymology ==
The village was known as Rose in German. Following the Second World War, the historic Polish name Róża was confirmed official by the Commission for the Determination of Place Names on 1 October 1948.

== History ==
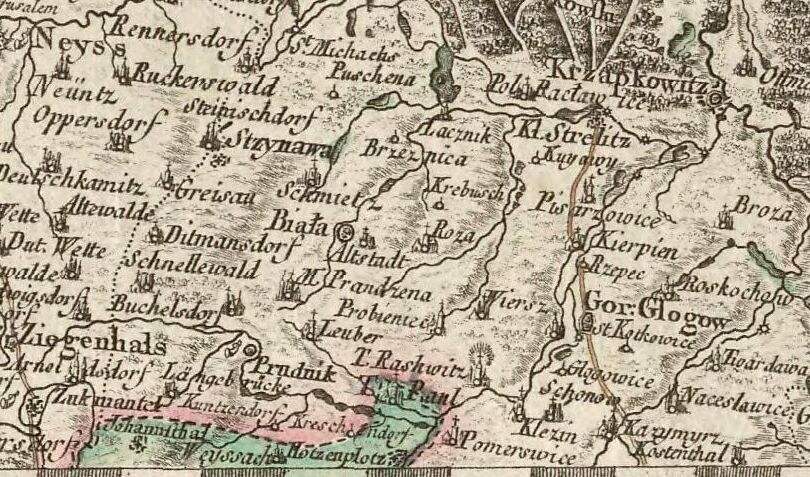
Roza among other localities on a Polish map from 1772

Until 1532 it was part of the Piast-ruled Duchy of Opole and Racibórz formed as a result of the medieval fragmentation of Poland into smaller duchies. Afterwards, it was integrated into the Bohemian Crown and Habsburg Empire, administratively becoming part of Głogówek County (circulus superioris Glogoviae) until 1742, and returning to Polish rule under the House of Vasa from 1645 to 1666. After the First Silesian War, it was annexed by the Kingdom of Prussia was incorporated into Prudnik County (Großkreis Neustadt).

Only a portion of Prudnik County participated in the 1921 Upper Silesia plebiscite, which was supposed to determine ownership of the Province of Upper Silesia between Germany and Poland. Róża found itself in the eastern part of the county, within the plebiscite area. In the end Róża remained in Germany.

Following the Second World War, from March to May 1945, Prudnik County was controlled by the Soviet military commandant's office. On 11 May 1945, it was passed on to the Polish administration.
