= Podlesie, Prudnik County =

Podlesie Waldeka
- Village
- Location within Poland
- Coordinates: 50°25′54″N 17°36′29″E
- Country: Poland
- Voivodeship: Opole
- County: Prudnik
- Gmina: Biała
- Time zone: UTC+1 (CET)
  - Summer (DST): UTC+2
- Postal code: 48-210
- Area code: +4877
- Vehicle registration: OPR

Podlesie (German: Waldeck), additional name: Waldeka, is a village in the administrative district of Gmina Biała, within Prudnik County, Opole Voivodeship, south-western Poland. It is situated in the historical region of Prudnik Land.
