= Prężyna =

Prężyna Groß Pramsen
- Village
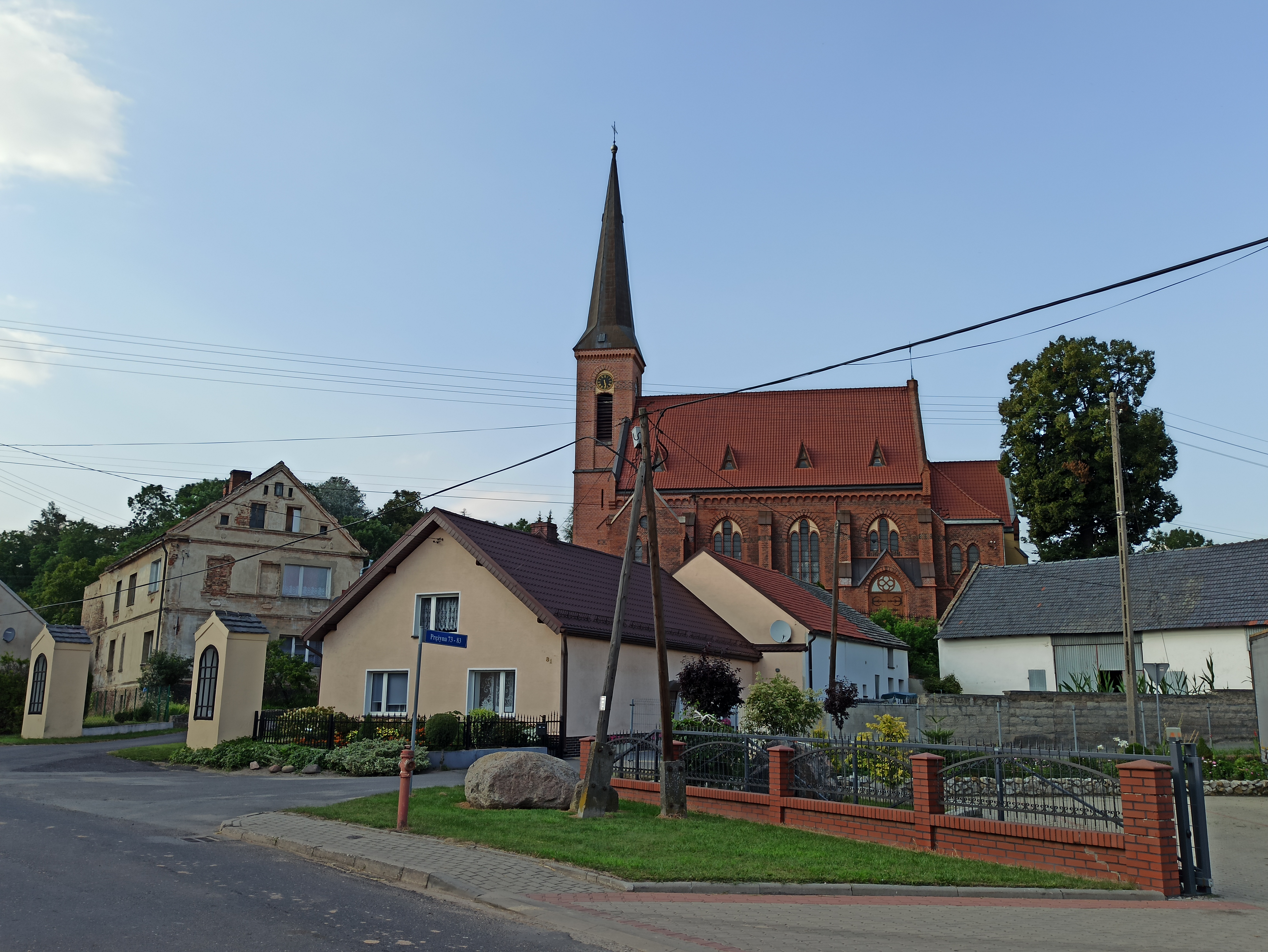

- Location within Poland
- Coordinates: 50°22′38″N 17°38′23″E
- Country: Poland
- Voivodeship: Opole
- County: Prudnik
- Gmina: Biała
- Time zone: UTC+1 (CET)
  - Summer (DST): UTC+2 (CEST)
- Vehicle registration: OPR
- Website: http://republika.pl/prezyna

Prężyna [prɛ̃ˈʐɨna] (formerly Polish: Prężyna Wielka, additional name in German: Groß Pramsen) is a village in the administrative district of Gmina Biała, within Prudnik County, Opole Voivodeship, in southern Poland.
