= Młynki, Opole Voivodeship =

Młynki
- Village
- Location within Poland
- Coordinates: 50°25′18″N 17°42′33″E
- Country: Poland
- Voivodeship: Opole
- County: Prudnik
- Gmina: Biała
- Time zone: UTC+1 (CET)
  - Summer (DST): UTC+2
- Area code: +4877
- Vehicle registration: OPR

Młynki (German: Mlinki) is a village in the administrative district of Gmina Biała, within Prudnik County, Opole Voivodeship, south-western Poland. It is situated in the historical region of Prudnik Land.

The village was known as Mlinki and Mühlhof Ansorge in German. Following the Second World War, the Polish name Młynki was introduced by the Commission for the Determination of Place Names on 15 December 1949.
