= Laskowiec, Opole Voivodeship =

Laskowiec
- Village
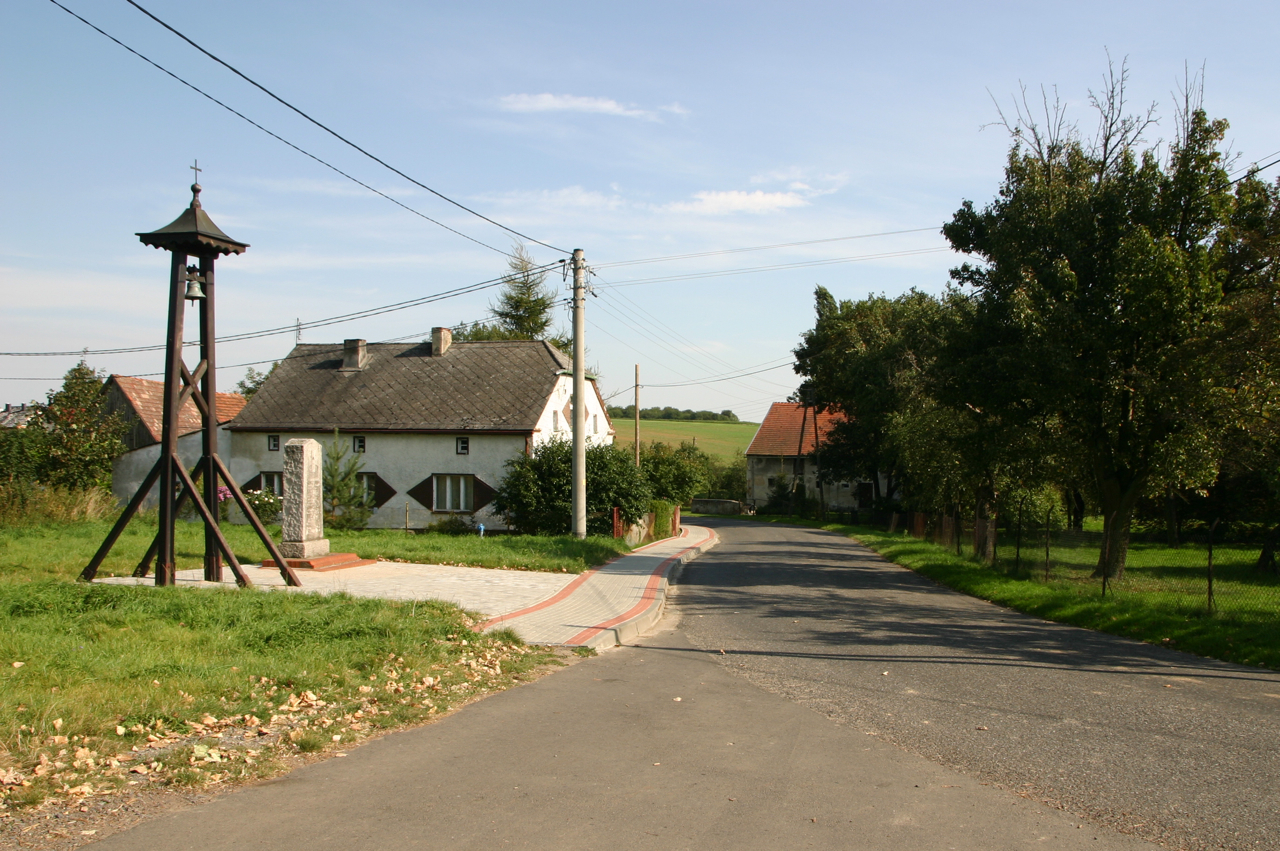

- Location within Poland
- Coordinates: 50°22′55″N 17°34′33″E
- Country: Poland
- Voivodeship: Opole
- County: Prudnik
- Gmina: Biała

Laskowiec [lasˈkɔvʲɛt͡s] (German: Haselvorwerk) is a village in the administrative district of Gmina Biała, within Prudnik County, Opole Voivodeship, in south-western Poland.

== See also ==
- Prudnik Land
