= Nagłów =

- Village
- Location within Poland
- Coordinates: 50°28′49″N 17°42′02″E
- Country: Poland
- Voivodeship: Opole
- County: Prudnik
- Gmina: Biała
- Time zone: UTC+1 (CET)
  - Summer (DST): UTC+2
- Area code: +4877
- Vehicle registration: OPR

Nagłów (German: Noglo) is a village in the administrative district of Gmina Biała, within Prudnik County, Opole Voivodeship, south-western Poland. It is situated in the historical region of Prudnik Land.

Following the Second World War, the Polish name Nagłów was introduced by the Commission for the Determination of Place Names on 1 October 1948. The village is also known as Nouglo and Nogło.
