= Kokot =

Kokot may refer to:

- Kokot, Opole Voivodeship, a village in Gmina Biała, Prudnik County, Opole Voivodeship, Poland
- Kokot, Świętokrzyskie Voivodeship, a village in Gmina Kije, Pińczów County, Świętokrzyskie Voivodeship, Poland
- Kokot (magazine), a defunct Croatian magazine
- Kokot (surname), includes a list of people with the name
- Kokot, formerly a tower of South Bohemian castle Choustník - see List of castles in the South Bohemian Region
- Kokot, later Kakath, oldest name for the present-day town of Štúrovo in Slovakia
