= Gostomia, Opole Voivodeship =

Gostomia Simsdorf
- Village
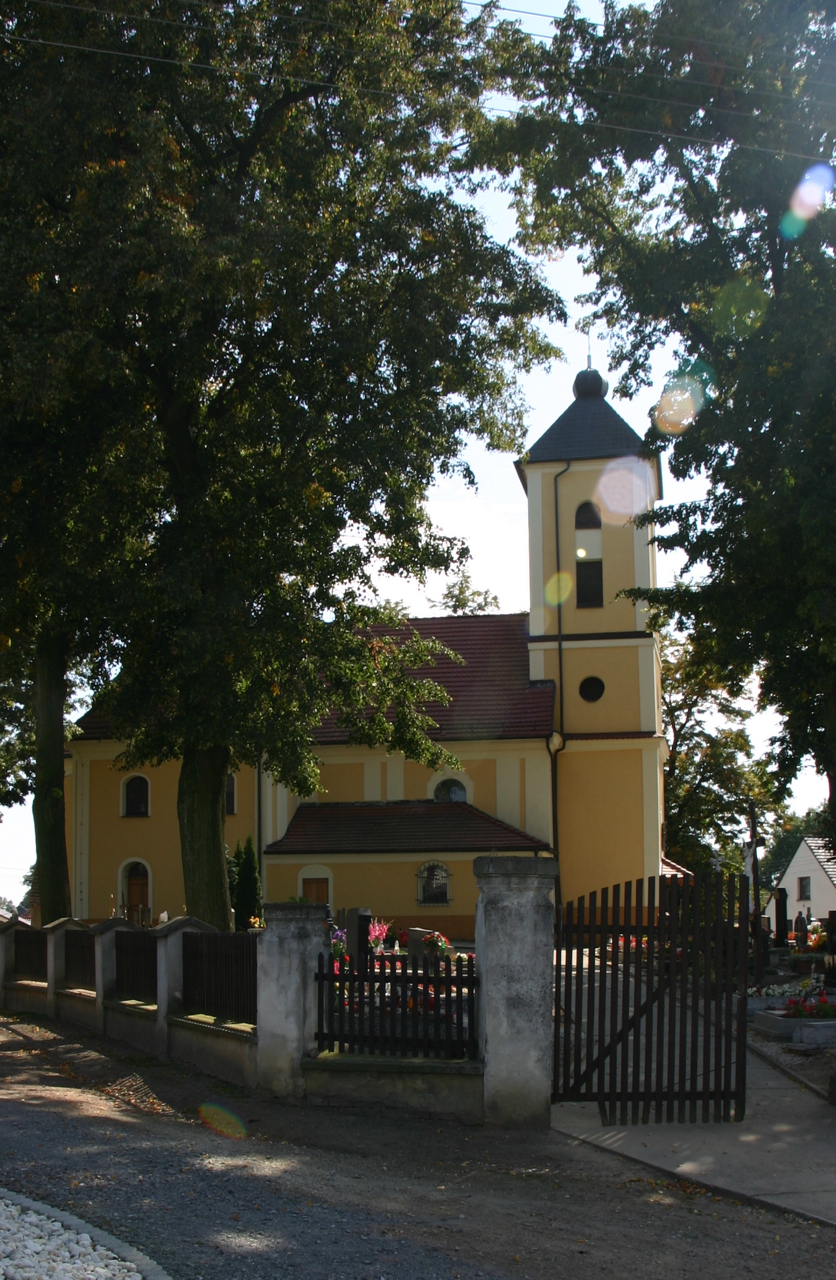
- Church of Guardian Angels in Gostomia

- Location within Poland
- Coordinates: 50°23′13″N 17°44′19″E
- Country: Poland
- Voivodeship: Opole
- County: Prudnik
- Gmina: Biała
- First mentioned: 1233
- Population: 392
- Time zone: UTC+1 (CET)
  - Summer (DST): UTC+2 (CEST)
- Vehicle registration: OPR
- Website: http://www.gostomia.webd.pl

Gostomia [ɡɔsˈtɔmʲa] (Silesian: Gostōmia, additional name in German: Simsdorf) is a village in the administrative district of Gmina Biała, within Prudnik County, Opole Voivodeship, in southern Poland.

== Notable people ==
- Filip Robota (1841–1902), Polish teacher, publicist and activist
- Władysław Robota (1872–1939), Polish priest and activist murdered by the SS during World War II
- Kolumban Sobota (1881–1949), Polish Franciscan friar

== See also ==
- Prudnik Land
