= Kokot, Opole Voivodeship =

Kokot Kolonia Kolnowice
- Village
- Location within Poland
- Coordinates: 50°24′25″N 17°33′48″E
- Country: Poland
- Voivodeship: Opole
- County: Prudnik
- Gmina: Biała

Population (2013)
  - Total: 9
- Time zone: UTC+1 (CET)
  - Summer (DST): UTC+2
- Postal code: 48-210
- Area code: +4877
- Vehicle registration: OPR

Kokot (German: Hahnvorwerk), additional name: Kolonia Kolnowice, is a village in the administrative district of Gmina Biała, within Prudnik County, Opole Voivodeship, south-western Poland. It is situated in the historical region of Prudnik Land. It lies approximately 9 km (6 mi) west of Biała, 12 km (7 mi) north of Prudnik, and 51 km (32 mi) south of the regional capital, Opole.

The village was a folwark. In 2013, there were 9 people living in Kokot.
