= Śródlesie (Osada Bud) =

Settlement in Silesia

Śródlesie Osada Bud
- Hamlet
- Location within Poland
- Coordinates: 50°32′17″N 17°46′45″E
- Country: Poland
- Voivodeship: Opole
- County: Prudnik
- Gmina: Biała
- Time zone: UTC+1 (CET)
  - Summer (DST): UTC+2
- SIMC: 0491216
- Vehicle registration: OPR

Śródlesie (German: Jägerhaus), alternitively named Osada Bud, is a hamlet in the administrative district of Gmina Biała, within Prudnik County, Opole Voivodeship, south-western Poland. It is situated in the historical region of Prudnik Land.

The village is located in the centre of the Bory Niemodlińskie forest complex.
