= Nowa Wieś Prudnicka =

Nowa Wieś Prudnicka Neudorf
- Village
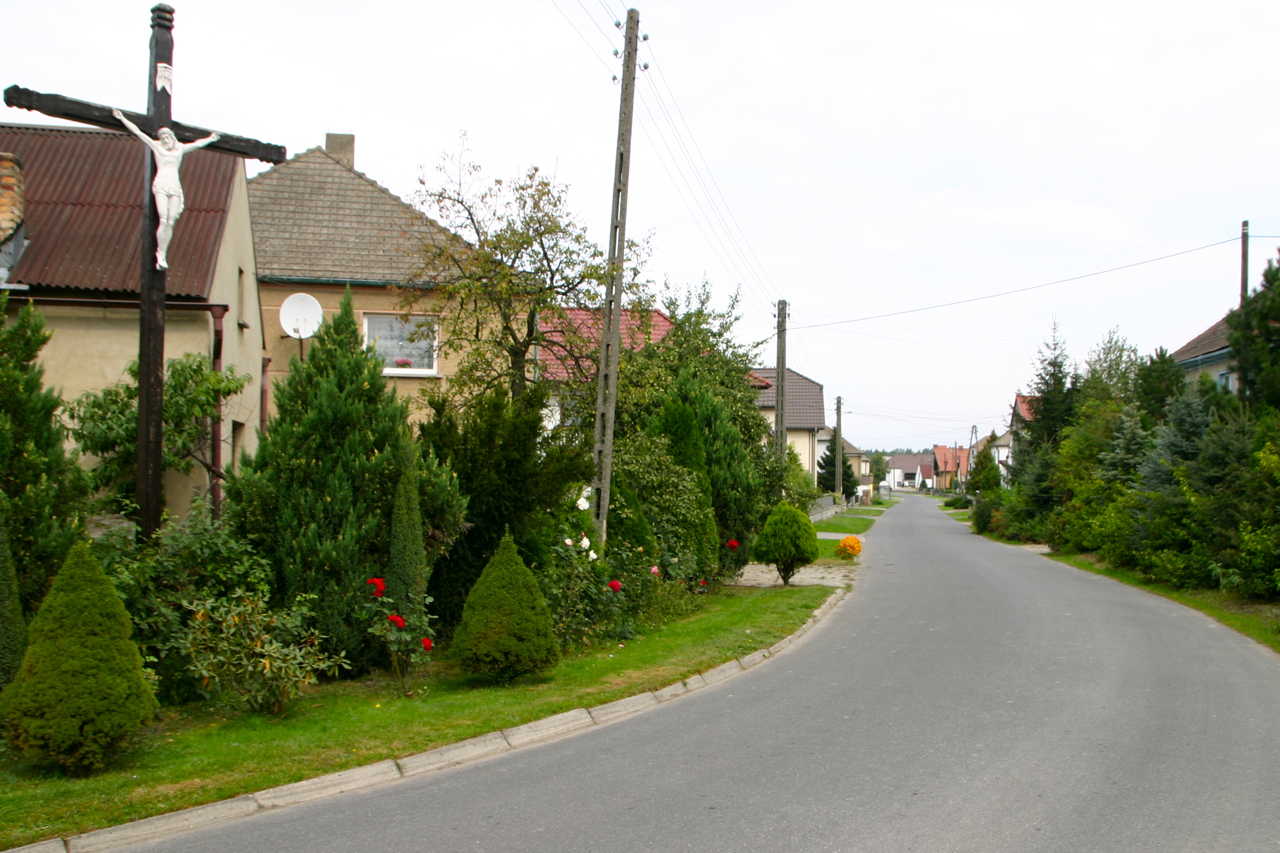

- Location within Poland
- Coordinates: 50°24′19″N 17°45′30″E
- Country: Poland
- Voivodeship: Opole
- County: Prudnik
- Gmina: Biała
- Founded: 1300
- Time zone: UTC+1 (CET)
  - Summer (DST): UTC+2 (CEST)
- Vehicle registration: OPR

Nowa Wieś Prudnicka ([ˈnɔva ˈvʲɛɕ prudˈɲit͡ska], additional name in German: Neudorf) is a village in the administrative district of Gmina Biała, within Prudnik County, Opole Voivodeship, in southern Poland.

The village was established in 1300.

== See also ==
- Prudnik Land
