= Łącznik =

Łącznik Lonschnik
- Village
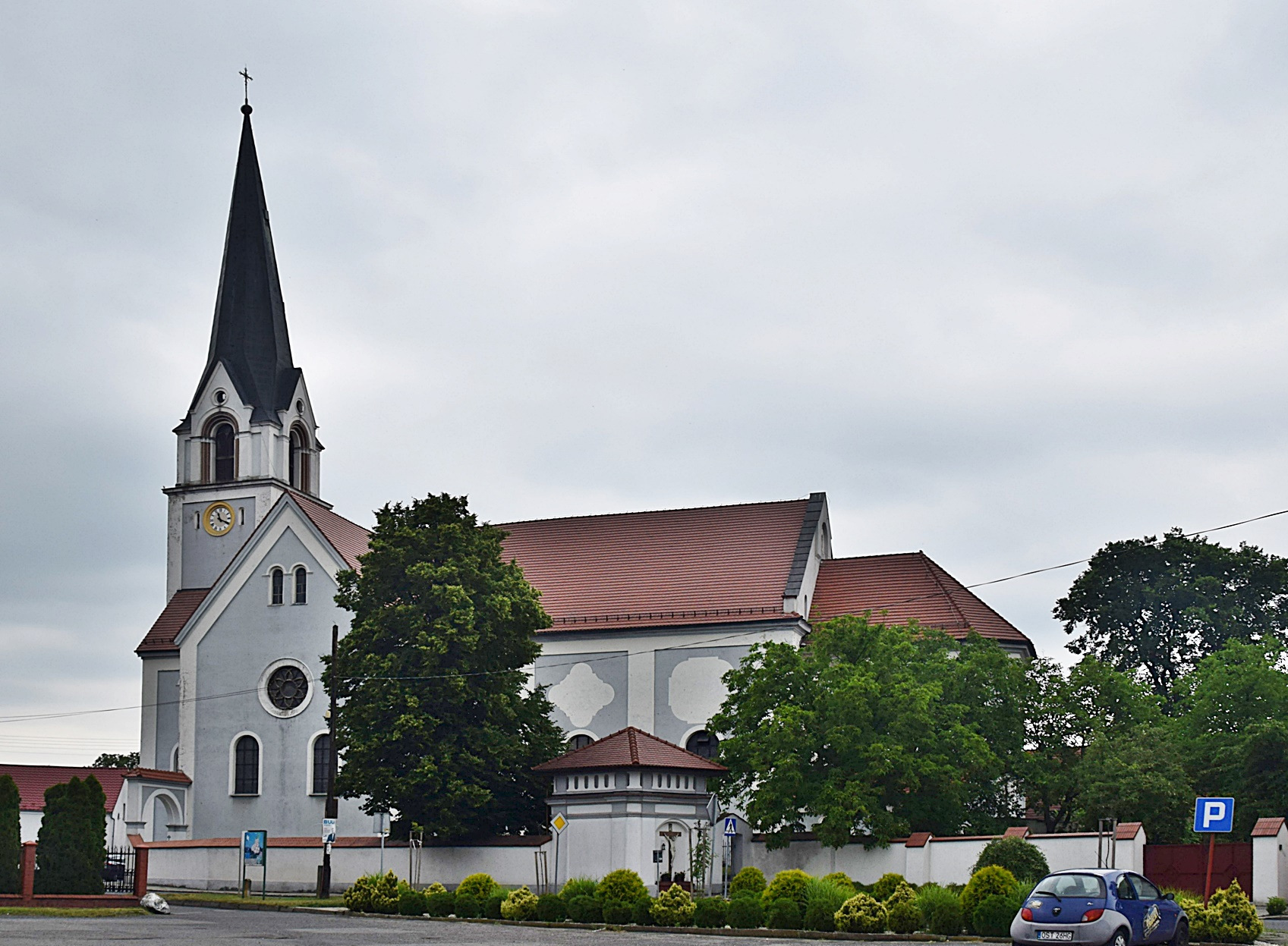
- Church of the Visitation of the Blessed Virgin Mary in Łącznik

- Location within Poland
- Coordinates: 50°27′6″N 17°43′48″E
- Country: Poland
- Voivodeship: Opole
- County: Prudnik
- Gmina: Biała
- Time zone: UTC+1 (CET)
  - Summer (DST): UTC+2 (CEST)
- Vehicle registration: OPR

Łącznik ([ˈwɔnt͡ʂɲik], additional name in German: Lonschnik) is a village in the administrative district of Gmina Biała, within Prudnik County, Opole Voivodeship, in southern Poland.

The name of the village is of Polish origin and comes from the word łąka, which means "field".

== See also ==
- Prudnik Land
