= Grabina, Opole Voivodeship =

Grabina Grabine
- Village
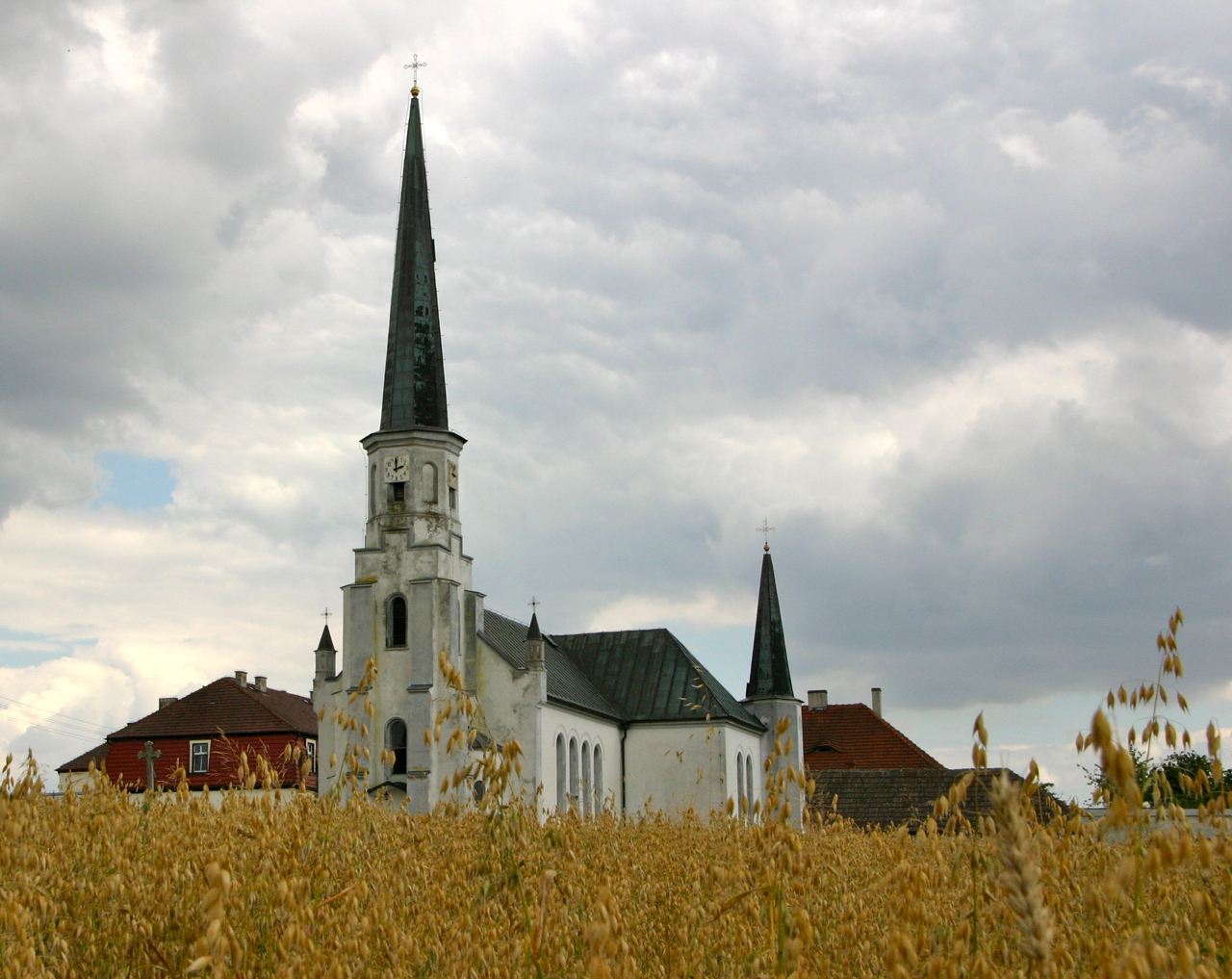
- Our Lady of the Scapular church in Grabina

- Location within Poland
- Coordinates: 50°26′28″N 17°38′39″E
- Country: Poland
- Voivodeship: Opole
- County: Prudnik
- Gmina: Biała
- Time zone: UTC+1 (CET)
  - Summer (DST): UTC+2 (CEST)
- Vehicle registration: OPR

Grabina ([ɡraˈbʲina], additional name in German: Grabine) is a village in the administrative district of Gmina Biała, within Prudnik County, Opole Voivodeship, in south-western Poland.

== See also ==
- Prudnik Land
