= Gmina Biała, Opole Voivodeship =

Gmina Biała Biała Commune
- Gmina
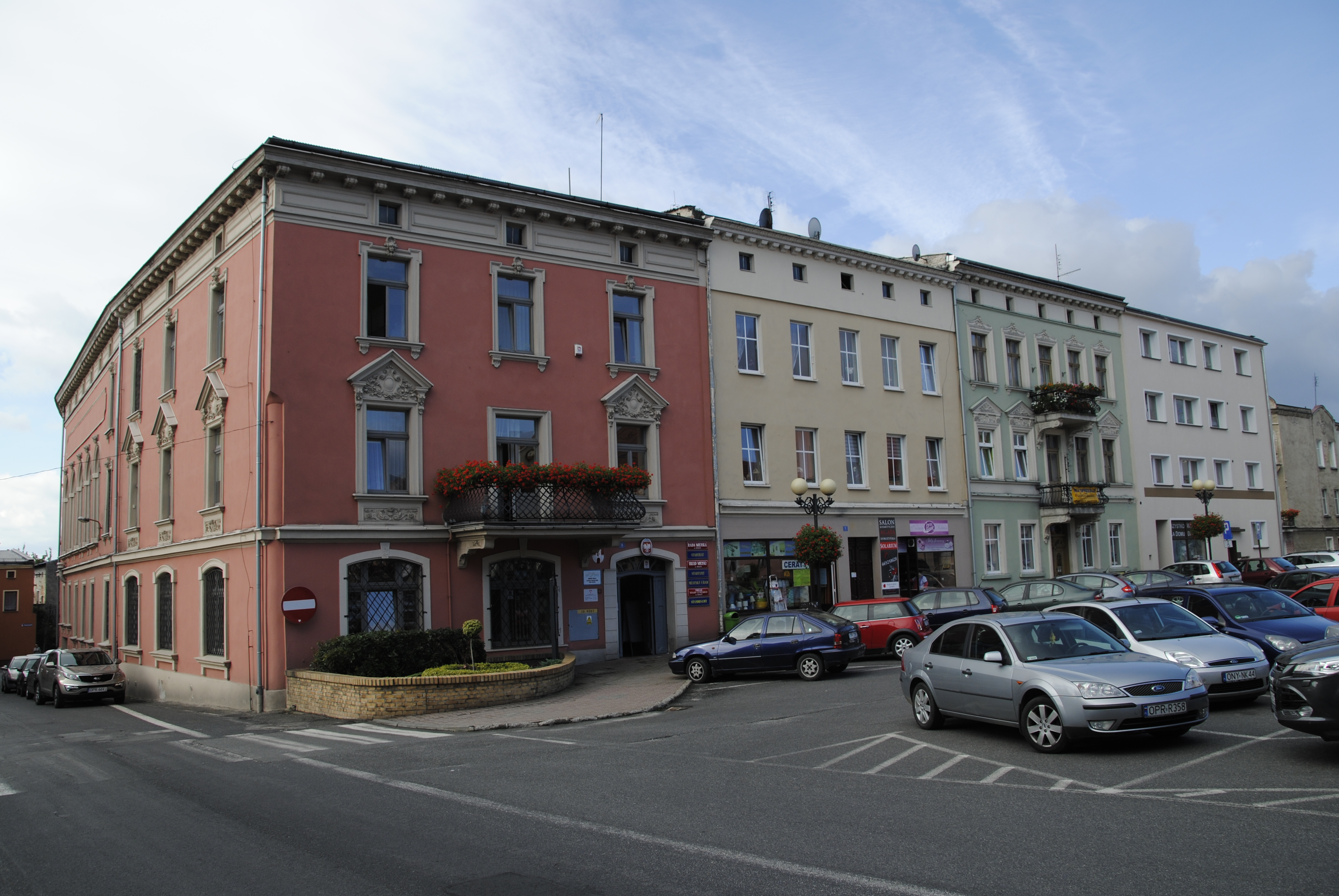
- Market Square in Biała with the gmina office on the left

- Flag Coat of arms
- Interactive map of Gmina Biała
- Coordinates (Biała): 50°24′N 17°40′E
- Country: Poland
- Voivodeship: Opole
- County: Prudnik
- Seat: Biała

Area
  - Total: 195.82 km^{2} (75.61 sq mi)

Population (2019-06-30)
  - Total: 10,586
  - Density: 54.060/km^{2} (140.01/sq mi)
  - Urban: 2,426
  - Rural: 8,160
- Time zone: UTC+1 (CET)
  - Summer (DST): UTC+2 (CEST)
- Vehicle registration: OPR
- Website: http://biala.gmina.pl/

Gmina Biała (German: Gemeinde Zülz) is an urban-rural gmina (administrative district) in Prudnik County, Opole Voivodeship, in Upper Silesia in southern Poland. Its seat is the town of Biała, which lies approximately 11 kilometres (7 mi) northeast of Prudnik and 36 km (22 mi) southwest of the regional capital Opole.

The gmina covers an area of 195.82 square kilometres (75.6 sq mi), and as of 2019 its total population was 10,586. Since 2006, in addition to the official Polish language, German has been recognized as an additional secondary language.

== Villages ==
Apart from the town of Biała, Gmina Biała contains the villages and settlements of:

- Browiniec Polski
- Brzeźnica
- Chrzelice
- Czartowice
- Dębina
- Frącki
- Górka Prudnicka
- Gostomia
- Grabina
- Jeleni Dwór
- Józefów
- Kokot
- Kolnowice
- Kolonia Ligocka
- Kolonia Otocka, Grabina
- Kolonia Otocka, Otoki
- Kolonia Pogórze
- Krobusz
- Łącznik
- Laskowiec
- Ligota Bialska
- Miłowice
- Młynki
- Mokra
- Nagłów
- Nowa Wieś Prudnicka
- Ogiernicze
- Olbrachcice
- Otoki
- Podlesie
- Pogórze
- Prężyna
- Radostynia
- Rostkowice
- Róża
- Śmicz
- Śmieciak
- Solec
- Śródlesie (Majzlówka)
- Śródlesie (Osada Bud)
- Wasiłowice
- Wilków
- Żabnik

== Neighbouring gminas ==
Gmina Biała is bordered by the gminas of Głogówek, Korfantów, Lubrza, Prószków, Prudnik, and Strzeleczki.

== Twin towns and sister cities ==
Gmina Biała is twinned with:

- Marienheide, Germany
- Město Albrechtice, Czech Republic
- Vlčice, Czech Republic
