= Śródlesie (Majzlówka) =

Settlement in Silesia

Śródlesie Majzlówka
- Hamlet
- Location within Poland
- Coordinates: 50°29′04″N 17°45′33″E
- Country: Poland
- Voivodeship: Opole
- County: Prudnik
- Gmina: Biała
- Time zone: UTC+1 (CET)
  - Summer (DST): UTC+2
- SIMC: 0491200
- Vehicle registration: OPR

Śródlesie (German: Försterei Sedschütz), alternatively called Majzlówka, is a hamlet in the administrative district of Gmina Biała, within Prudnik County, Opole Voivodeship, south-western Poland. It is situated in the historical region of Prudnik Land.
