= Olbrachcice, Opole Voivodeship =

Olbrachcice Olbersdorf
- Village
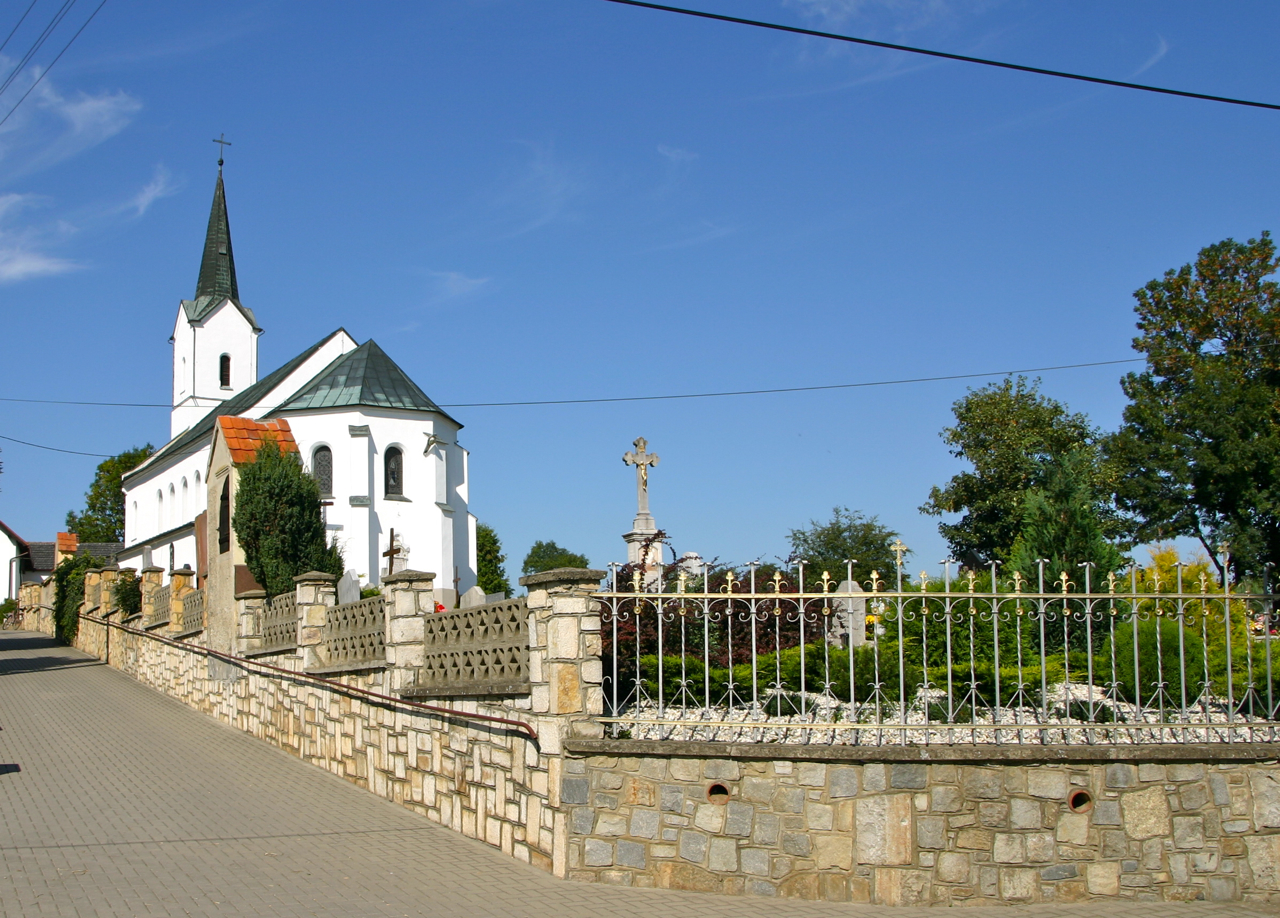
- Immaculate Conception church and cemetery

- Location within Poland
- Coordinates: 50°21′51″N 17°42′19″E
- Country: Poland
- Voivodeship: Opole
- County: Prudnik
- Gmina: Biała
- Time zone: UTC+1 (CET)
  - Summer (DST): UTC+2 (CEST)
- Vehicle registration: OPR

Olbrachcice ([ɔlbraxˈt͡ɕit͡sɛ], additional name in German: Olbersdorf) is a village in the administrative district of Gmina Biała, within Prudnik County, Opole Voivodeship, in southern Poland.

== History ==
It was a possession of the Order of Saint Paul the First Hermit until secularization in 1810. In 1861, it had a population of 613, entirely Roman Catholic by confession.

16 Polish citizens were murdered by Nazi Germany in the village during World War II.

== See also ==
- Prudnik Land
