= Kokotović =

Kokotović (Serbian Cyrillic: Кокотовић) is a Serbian and Croatian surname, derived from the Slavic word kokot, meaning "rooster, cock". Notable people with the surname include:

- Dragan Kokotović, Serbian footballer
- Ljubomir Kokotović, Serbian artist
- Mirko Kokotović, Croatian football manager, former footballer
- Misha Kokotovic, American Latin American literature scholar
- Petar V. Kokotovic, professor in the Department of Engineering at the University of California
- Peter Kokotowitsch (1890–1968), Austrian wrestler
- Joe and Ilija Kokotovic, two brothers of the 'Croatian Six', a group of Croatian-Australians jailed for a bombing conspiracy
- Vlada Kokotović, Serbian bassist in Goblini
- Milka Podrug-Kokotović (1930–2025), Croatian actress

== See also ==
- Kokot (surname)
