= Kokot (surname) =

Kokot is a Slavic surname. Notable people with the surname include:

- Aleš Kokot (born 1979), Slovenian footballer
- Alfred Kokot (1928–1981), Polish football player
- Franciszek Kokot (1929–2021), Polish nephrologist and endocrinologist
- Henryk Kokot (1926–1997), Polish football player
- Józef Kokot (1929–2018), Polish football player
- Karmen Kokot, Croatian handball player
- Manfred Kokot (born 1948), East German athlete
- Zoran Kokot (born 1985), Bosnian Serb football player

== See also ==
- Kokotović
