= Montagne Cocotte =

Mountain in Mauritius

Coordinates: 20.44°S 57.47°E

Montagne Cocotte is a 771-metre-tall (2,530 ft) mountain peak in Mauritius. It is located in the far south of the island nation, in the Savanne District and in the Black River Gorges National Park. On the mountain slopes can be seen high altitude rainforest.
