= Chrzelice =

Chrzelice Schelitz
- Village
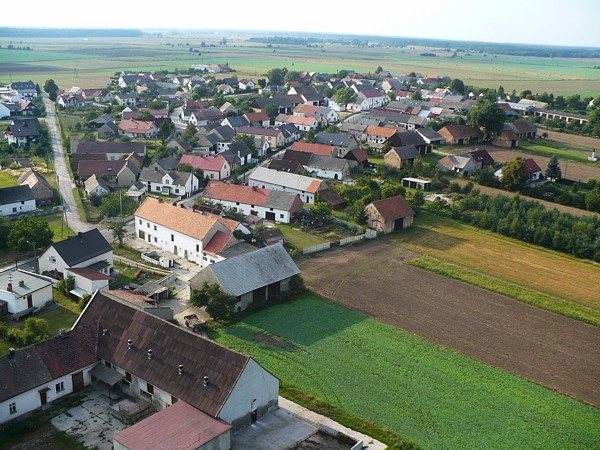
- Aerial view of Chrzelice

- Coat of arms

- Location within Poland
- Coordinates: 50°28′N 17°44′E
- Country: Poland
- Voivodeship: Opole
- County: Prudnik
- Gmina: Biała

Population
  - Total: 654
- Time zone: UTC+1 (CET)
  - Summer (DST): UTC+2 (CEST)
- Vehicle registration: OPR
- Website: http://chrzelice.pl/

Chrzelice ([xʂɛˈlʲit͡sɛ], additional name in German: Schelitz) is a village in the administrative district of Gmina Biała, within Prudnik County, Opole Voivodeship, in southern Poland.

== History ==
The village was founded in the later half of the 13th century.

In the Upper Silesia plebiscite on the 20th march 1921, the majority of villagers (777) voted to stay with Germany while only 39 voted for Poland.

During World War II, the German administration operated the E31 forced labour subcamp of the Stalag VIII-B/344 prisoner-of-war camp for Allied POWs in the village.

== See also ==
- Prudnik Land
