= Lu, the Coquette =

- Directed by: Michael Curtiz
- Release date: 1918
- Country: Hungary
- Language: Hungarian

Lu, the Coquette (Hungarian: Lu, a kokott) is a 1918 Hungarian film directed by Michael Curtiz.
