= Agnieszczyn =

- Village
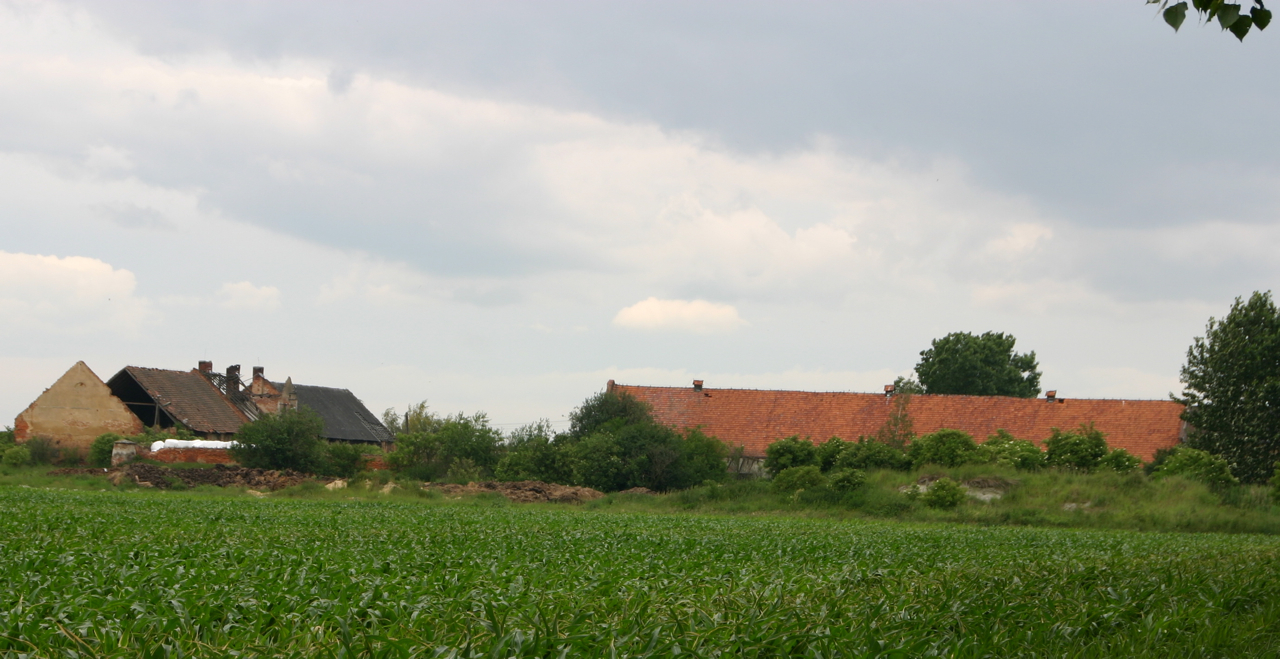

- Location within Poland
- Coordinates: 50°23′02″N 17°54′49″E
- Country: Poland
- Voivodeship: Opole
- County: Krapkowice
- Gmina: Krapkowice
- Time zone: UTC+1 (CET)
  - Summer (DST): UTC+2
- Area code: +4877
- Vehicle registration: OKR

Agnieszczyn (German: Agnesenhof) is a village in the administrative district of Gmina Krapkowice, within Krapkowice County, Opole Voivodeship, south-western Poland. It is situated in the historical region of Prudnik Land.

== Etymology ==
The village was known as Agnesenhof in German. Following the Second World War, the Polish name Agnieszczyn was introduced by the Commission for the Determination of Place Names on 1 October 1948. The village is also known as Agnieszów, Agnieszyn, and Agnieszków.

== History ==
The folwark of Agnieszczyn was established in the 19th century by the Seherr-Thoss family of Dobra. It was named after Ernst von Seherr-Thoss' wife, Agnes Leopoldine Kasimiere von Loen. It was surrounded by arable land and gardens, and 39 acres of meadows. At the beginning of the 19th century, the farm held 34 horses, 91 bulls, 3,200 sheep, and 8 pigs. The estate included a mill. Agnieszczów was inhabited by hired laborers and their families. On 5 March 1934, Agnieszczyn was acquired by Hans von Oppersdorff from Głogówek.
