= Wygon, Opole Voivodeship =

Wygon Rajdyna
- Village
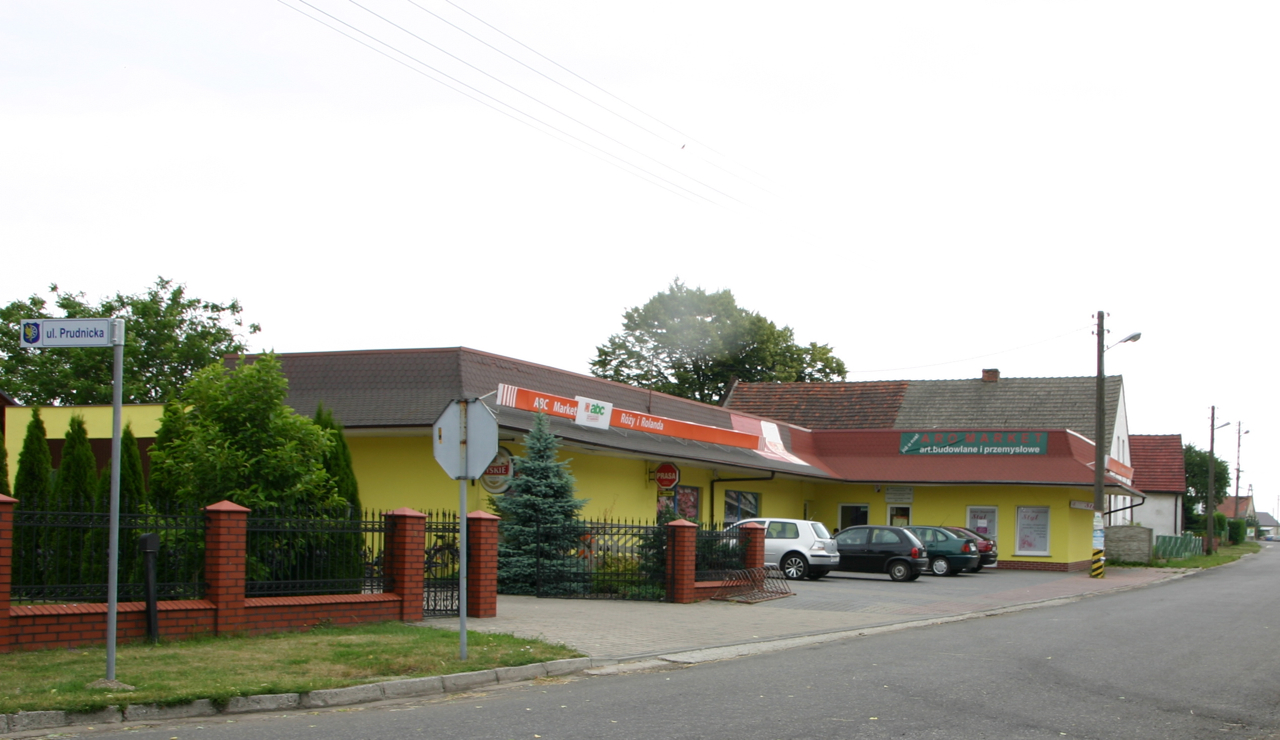

- Location within Poland
- Coordinates: 50°24′36″N 17°53′27″E
- Country: Poland
- Voivodeship: Opole
- County: Krapkowice
- Gmina: Krapkowice
- Time zone: UTC+1 (CET)
  - Summer (DST): UTC+2
- Postal code: 47-351
- Area code: +4877
- Vehicle registration: OKR

Wygon (German: Reitersdorf), additional name: Rajdyna, is a village in the administrative district of Gmina Krapkowice, within Krapkowice County, Opole Voivodeship, south-western Poland. It is situated in the historical region of Prudnik Land.
