= Czekaj, Opole Voivodeship =

Czekaj Folwark Chudoba
- Village
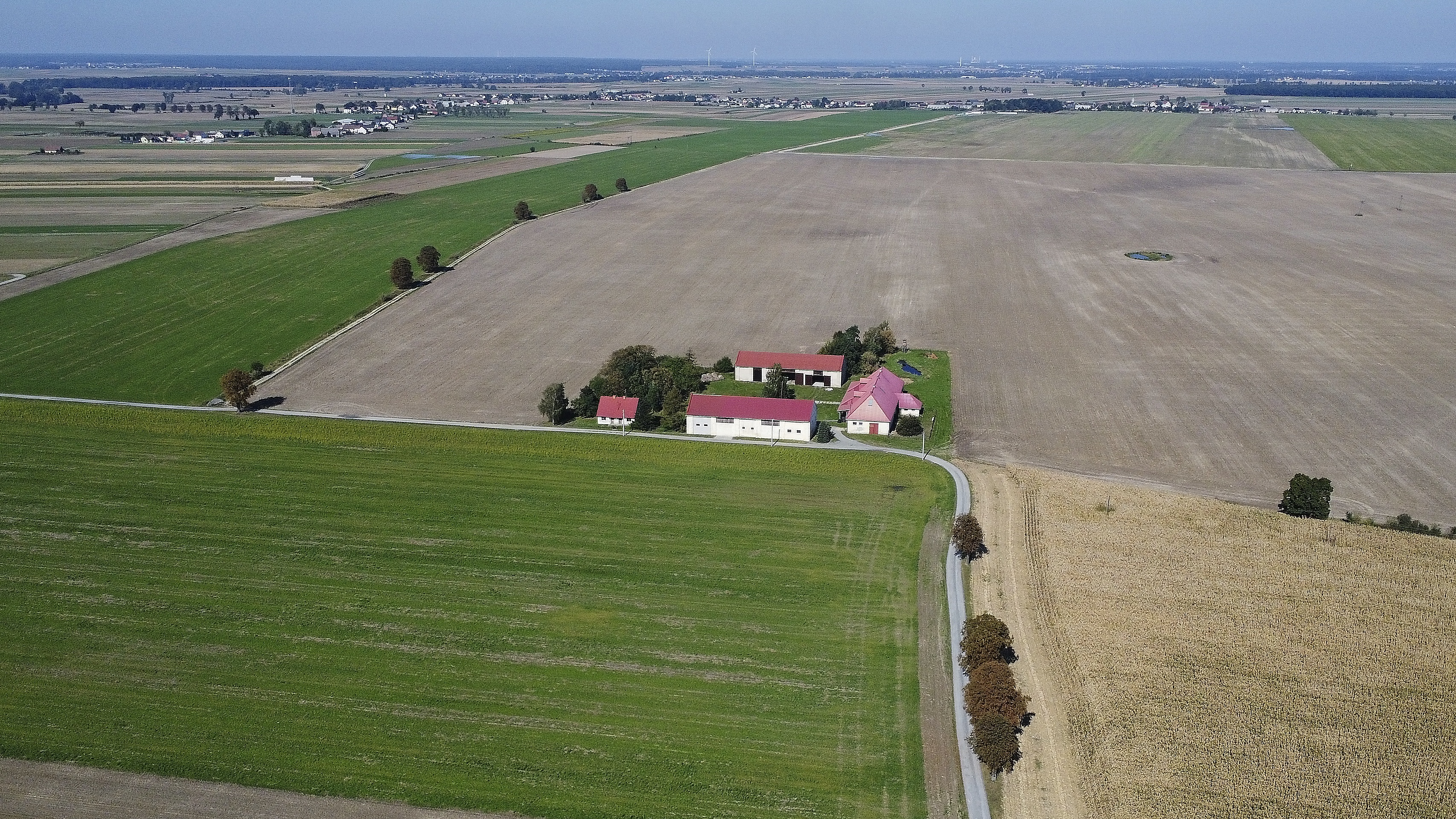

- Location within Poland
- Coordinates: 50°22′50″N 17°53′30″E
- Country: Poland
- Voivodeship: Opole
- County: Krapkowice
- Gmina: Krapkowice
- Time zone: UTC+1 (CET)
  - Summer (DST): UTC+2
- Postal code: 47-351
- Area code: +4877
- Vehicle registration: OKR

Czekaj (German: Schekai), additional name: Folwark Chudoba, is a village in the administrative district of Gmina Krapkowice, within Krapkowice County, Opole Voivodeship, southern Poland. It is situated in the historical region of Prudnik Land.

== Etymology ==
The name was historically known in Polish as Czekaj and Kudowa. The name Czekaj was derived from the Polish word czekaj (wait). Under German rule, the village's name was Germanized to Schekai. In 1936, the Nazi administration of Germany changed the village's name to Klein Warten to erase traces of Polish origin. Following the Second World War, the Polish name Czekaj was restored as official by the Commission for the Determination of Place Names on 1 October 1948.
