= Nowy Borek, Opole Voivodeship =

Nowy Borek
- Village
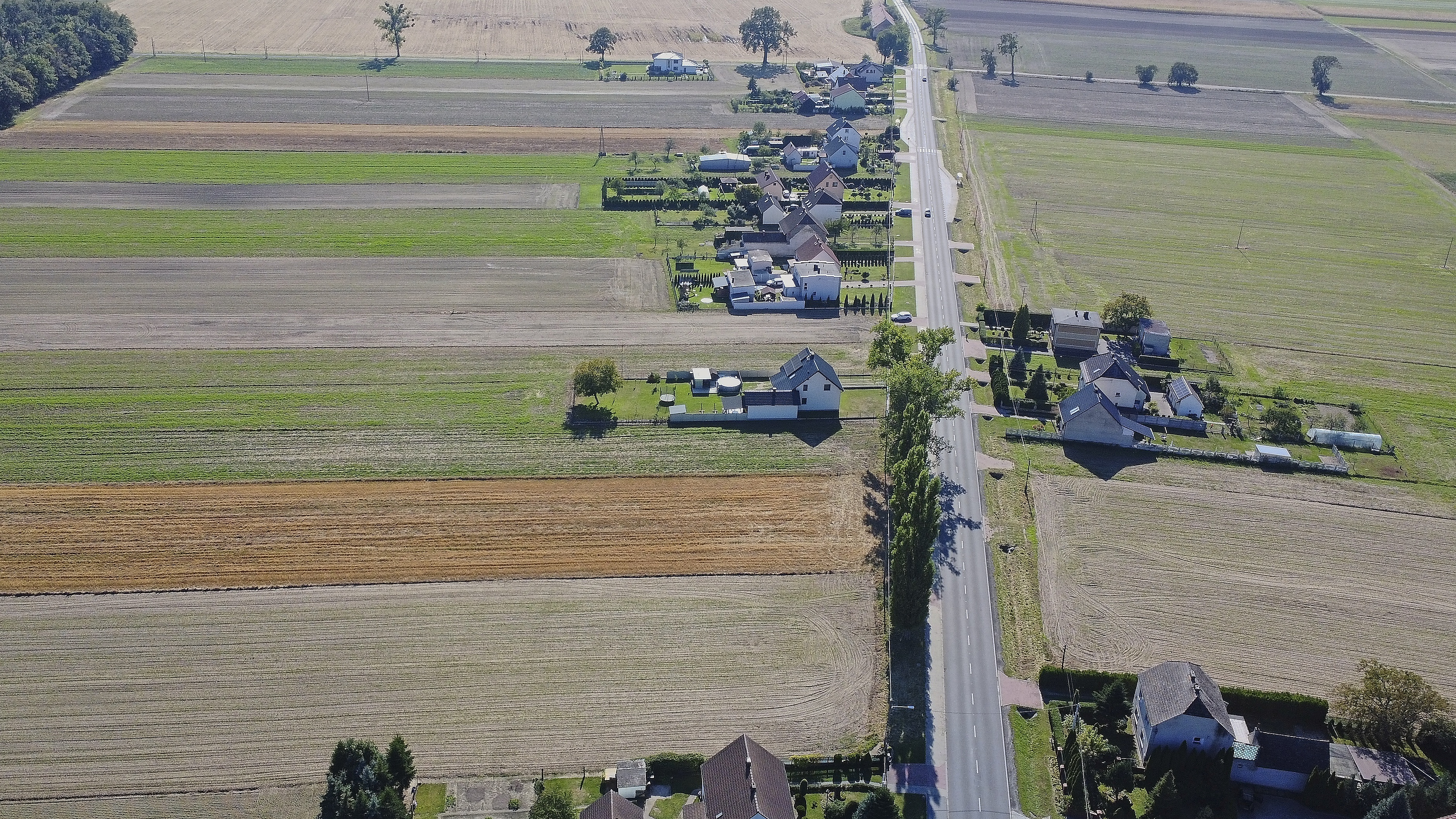

- Location within Poland
- Coordinates: 50°26′14″N 17°57′00″E
- Country: Poland
- Voivodeship: Opole
- County: Krapkowice
- Gmina: Krapkowice
- Time zone: UTC+1 (CET)
  - Summer (DST): UTC+2
- Area code: +4877
- Vehicle registration: OKR

Nowy Borek is a village in the administrative district of Gmina Krapkowice, within Krapkowice County, Opole Voivodeship, south-western Poland. It is situated in the historical region of Prudnik Land.
