= Borek, Gmina Krapkowice =

Borek
- Village
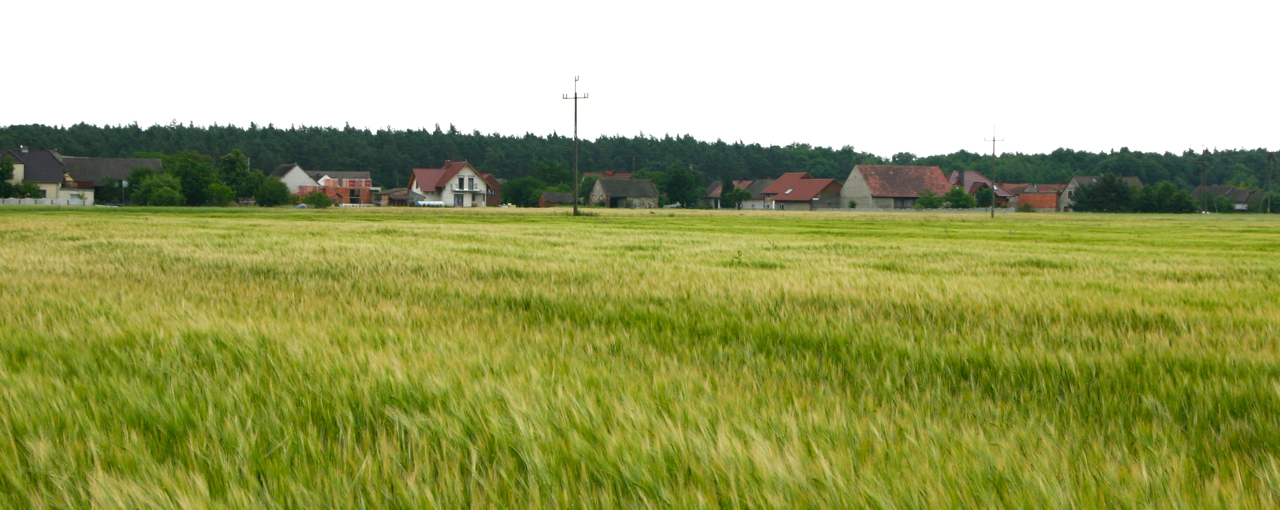

- Location within Poland
- Coordinates: 50°35′52″N 17°57′22″E
- Country: Poland
- Voivodeship: Opole
- County: Krapkowice
- Gmina: Krapkowice

Borek [ˈbɔrɛk] (German: Waldwinkel) is a village in the administrative district of Gmina Krapkowice, within Krapkowice County, Opole Voivodeship, in southwestern Poland.

== See also ==
- Prudnik Land
