= Żużela =

- Village
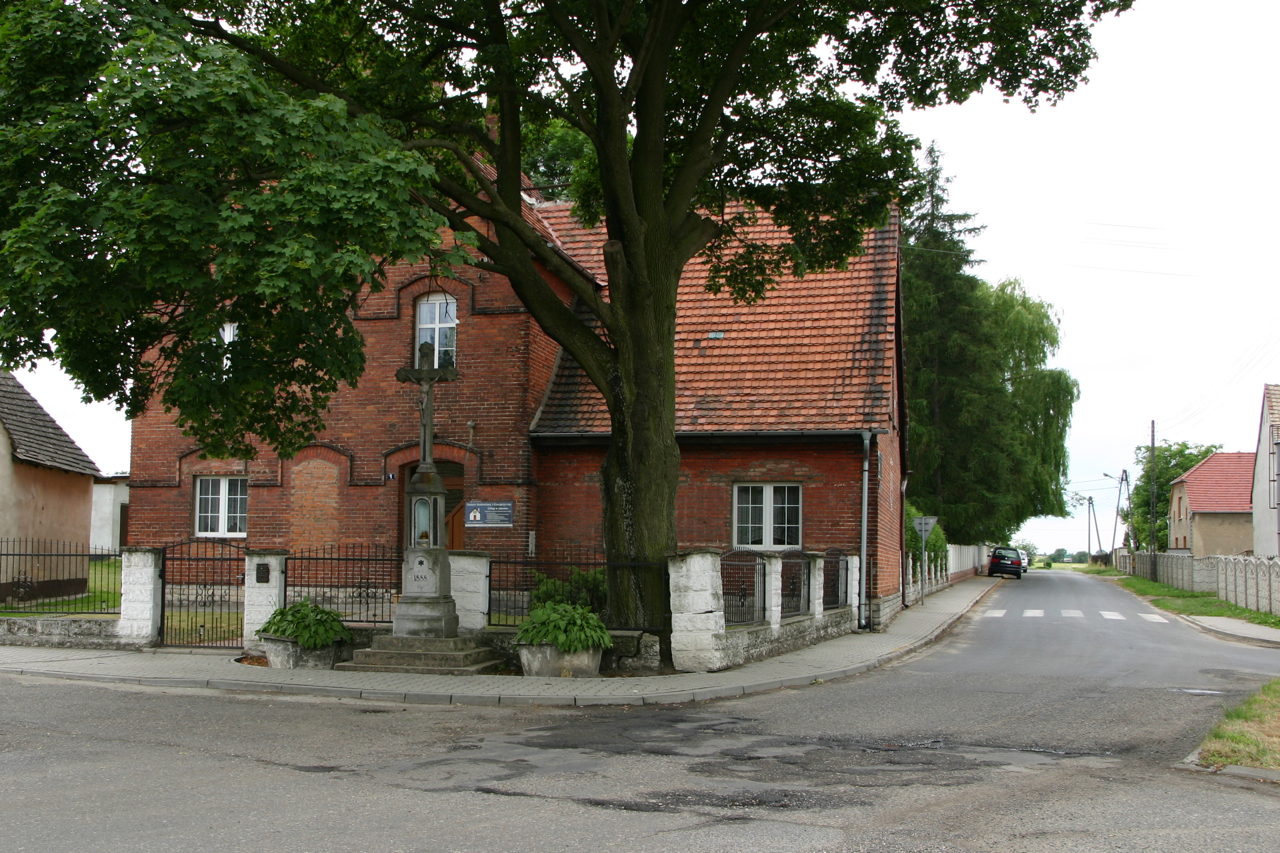

- Location within Poland
- Coordinates: 50°25′24″N 18°21′00″E
- Country: Poland
- Voivodeship: Opole
- County: Krapkowice
- Gmina: Krapkowice
- Time zone: UTC+1 (CET)
  - Summer (DST): UTC+2 (CEST)
- Vehicle registration: OKR

Żużela [ʐuˈʐɛla] (German: Zuzella) is a village in the administrative district of Gmina Krapkowice, within Krapkowice County, Opole Voivodeship, in southern Poland.

== History ==
It was first mentioned as Susela in 1213, when it was part of Piast-ruled Poland. The name is of Polish origin and comes from the word żużel, which means either "cinder" or "slag".

Under Nazi Germany, in 1934, it was renamed Schlacken to erase traces of Polish origin.

A Polish citizen was murdered by Nazi Germany in the village during World War II.

== Main sights ==
- manor house
- wayside shrines (19th century, 1913 and one undated)
- forge (built before 1939)
- three granite glacial erratics stated as natural monuments
