= Hojnowice =

- Village
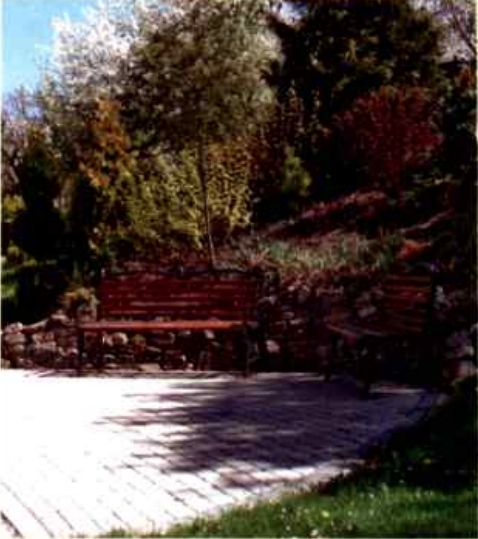

- Location within Poland
- Coordinates: 50°22′49″N 17°47′26″E
- Country: Poland
- Voivodeship: Opole
- County: Prudnik
- Gmina: Głogówek
- Established: 16th century
- Time zone: UTC+1 (CET)
  - Summer (DST): UTC+2
- Postal code: 48-250
- Area code: +4877
- Vehicle registration: OPR

Hojnowice (German: Hoinowitz) is a village in the administrative district of Gmina Głogówek, within Prudnik County, Opole Voivodeship, in southern Poland. It is situated in the historical region of Prudnik Land in Upper Silesia.

== Geography ==
The village is located in the southern part of Opole Voivodeship, close to the Czech Republic–Poland border. It is situated in the historical Prudnik Land region, as well as in Upper Silesia. It lies in the Silesian Lowlands. The National Register of Geographical Names for 2025 classified Hojnowice as a part (część wsi) of Mionów.

== Etymology ==
The village was also historically known in Polish as Chojnowiec. Under German rule the village's name was Hoinowitz. In 1936, Nazi administration of the German Reich changed the village's name to Reichenau to erase traces of Polish origin. Following the Second World War, the Polish name Hojnowice was introduced by the Commission for the Determination of Place Names on 1 October 1948.

== History ==
The village was established in the 16th century as a folwark. Until 1532 it was part of the Piast-ruled Duchy of Opole and Racibórz formed as a result of the medieval fragmentation of Poland into smaller duchies. Afterwards, it was integrated into the Bohemian Crown and Habsburg Empire, administratively becoming part of Głogówek County (circulus superioris Glogoviae) until 1742, and returning to Polish rule under the House of Vasa from 1645 to 1666. After the First Silesian War, it was annexed by the Kingdom of Prussia was incorporated into Prudnik County (Großkreis Neustadt).

Only a portion of Prudnik County participated in the 1921 Upper Silesia plebiscite, which was supposed to determine ownership of the Province of Upper Silesia between Germany and Poland. Hojnowice found itself in the eastern part of the county, within the plebiscite area. In the end Hojnowice remained in Germany.

Following the Second World War, from March to May 1945, Prudnik County was controlled by the Soviet military commandant's office. On 11 May 1945, it was passed on to the Polish administration.

== Transport ==
The local public transport buses were operated by PKS Prudnik. Since 2021, public transit is organized by the PGZT "Pogranicze" corporation in Prudnik.

== Bibliography ==
- Lesiuk, Wiesław (1978). Ziemia Prudnicka. Dzieje, gospodarka, kultura. Urząd Miasta i Gminy w Prudniku, Wydawnictwo Instytutu Śląskiego w Opolu. OCLC 251643861.
