= Gwoździce =

- Village
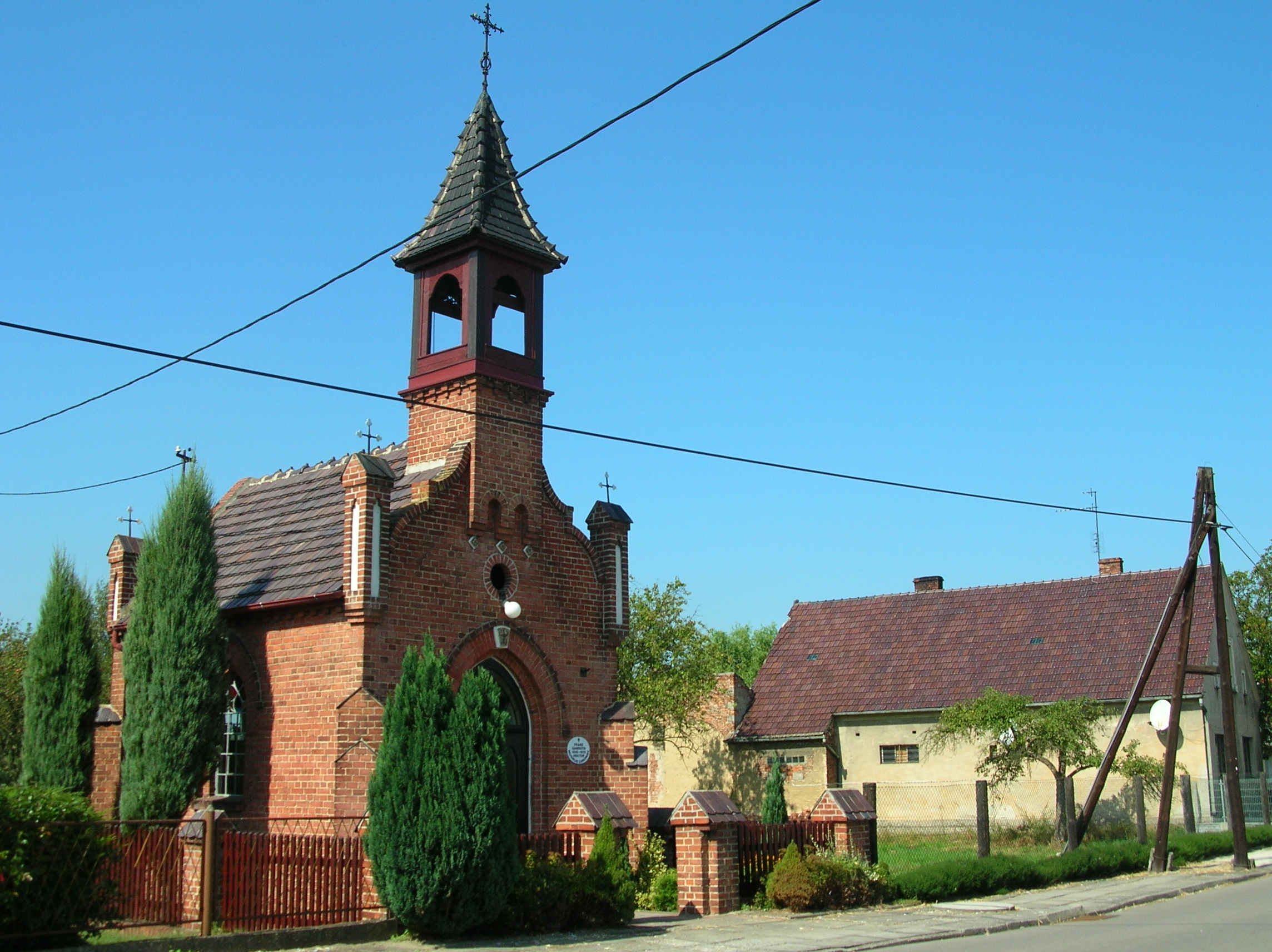
- Church at Gwoździce.

- Location within Poland
- Coordinates: 50°30′N 17°56′E
- Country: Poland
- Voivodeship: Opole
- County: Krapkowice
- Gmina: Krapkowice

Gwoździce [ɡvɔʑˈd͡ʑit͡sɛ] (German: Gwosdczütz) is a village in the administrative district of Gmina Krapkowice, within Krapkowice County, Opole Voivodeship, in south-western Poland.
