= Dąbrówka Górna =

- Village
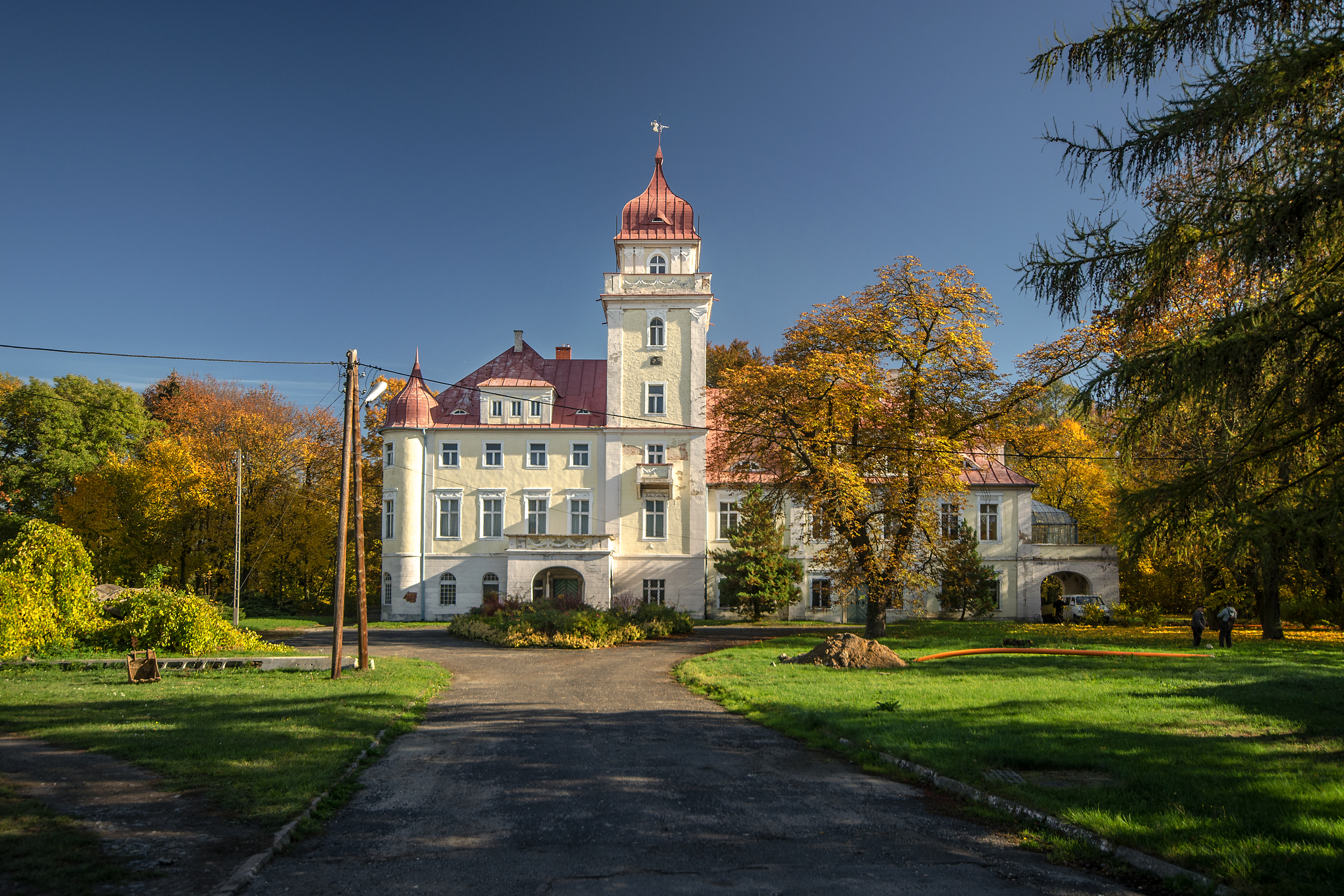
- Palace in Dąbrówka Górna

- Location within Poland
- Coordinates: 50°33′N 17°56′E
- Country: Poland
- Voivodeship: Opole
- County: Krapkowice
- Gmina: Krapkowice

Population
  - Total: 1,000
- Postal code: 47-300

Dąbrówka Górna [dɔmˈbrufka ˈɡurna] (German: Dombrowka) is a village in the administrative district of Gmina Krapkowice, within Krapkowice County, Opole Voivodeship, in southern Poland.
