= Posiłek, Gmina Krapkowice =

Posiłek
- Village
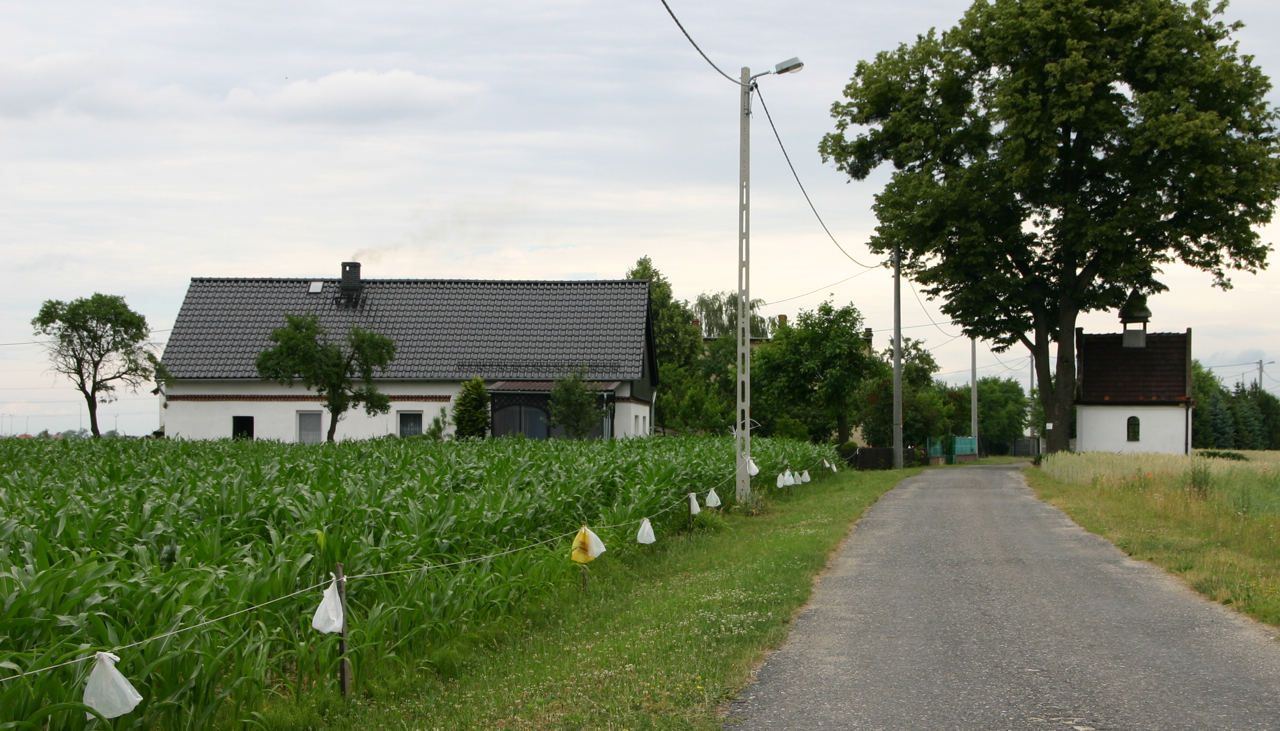
- Posiłek

- Location within Poland
- Coordinates: 50°31′29″N 17°54′49″E
- Country: Poland
- Voivodeship: Opole
- County: Krapkowice
- Gmina: Krapkowice
- Area: 0.8 km^{2} (0.31 sq mi)
- Time zone: UTC+1 (Central European Standard Time)
  - Summer (DST): UTC+2 (Central European Summer Time)

Posiłek [pɔˈɕiwɛk] (German: Poschillek) is a village in the administrative district of Gmina Krapkowice, within Krapkowice County, Opole Voivodeship, in south-western Poland.
