= Wesoła, Opole Voivodeship =

Wesoła
- Village
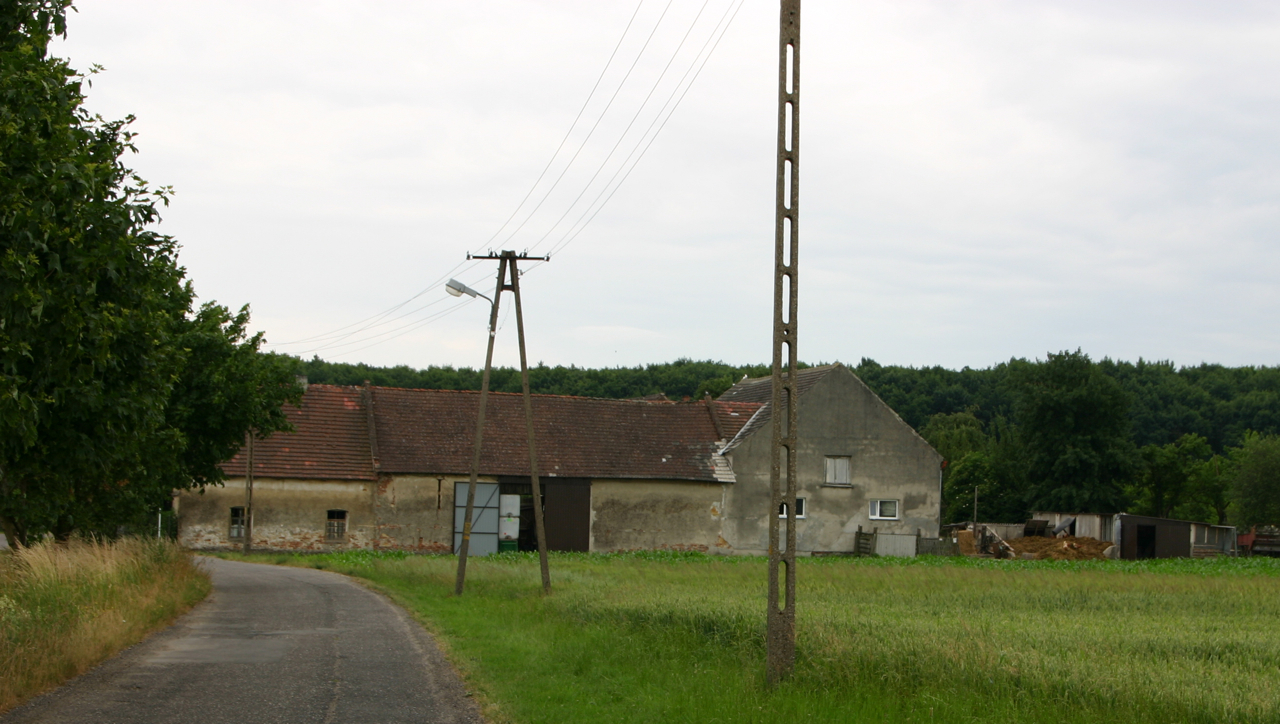

- Location within Poland
- Coordinates: 50°24′45″N 17°55′43″E
- Country: Poland
- Voivodeship: Opole
- County: Krapkowice
- Gmina: Krapkowice

Wesoła [vɛˈsɔwa] (German: Wessola) is a village in the administrative district of Gmina Krapkowice, within Krapkowice County, Opole Voivodeship, in south-western Poland.
