= Żywocice =

- Village
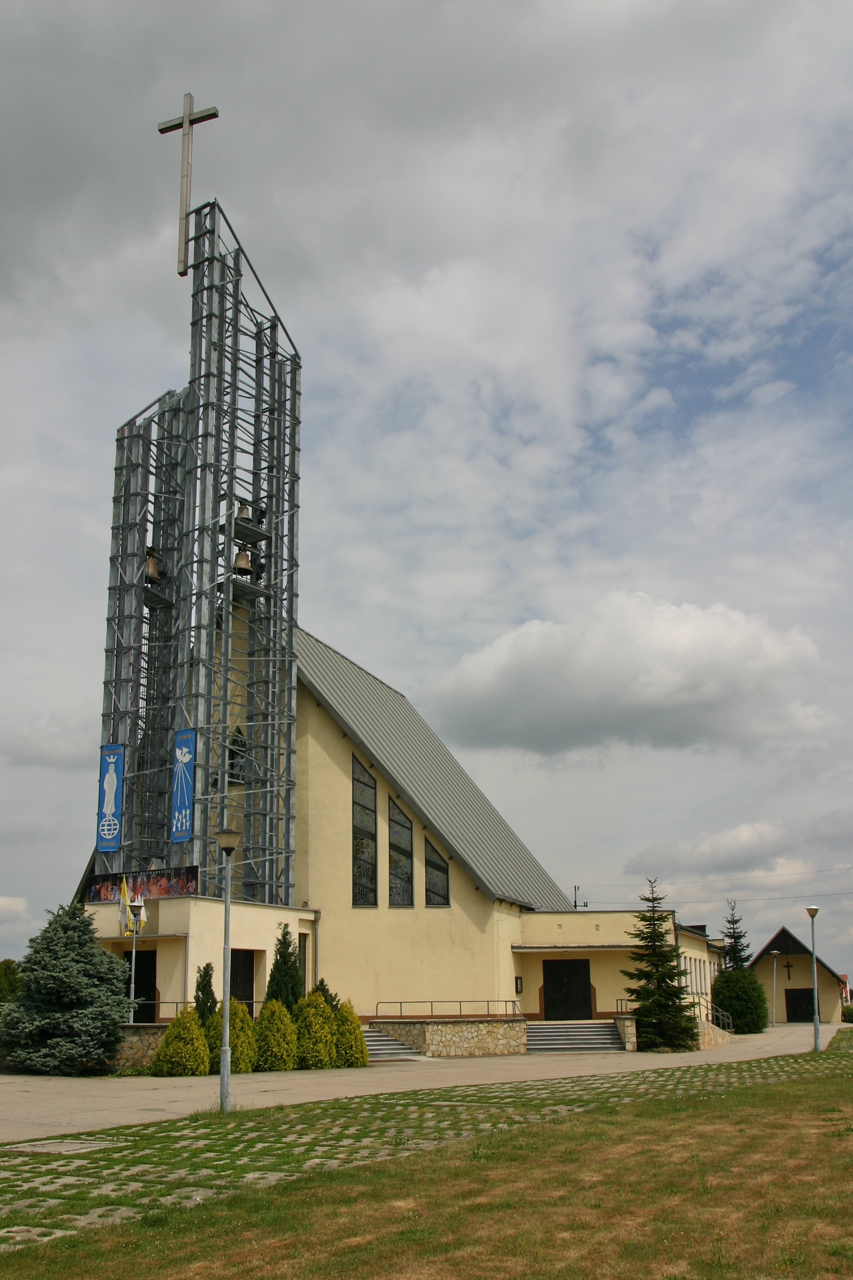
- Church of Saint Florian

- Location within Poland
- Coordinates: 50°27′30″N 17°58′0″E
- Country: Poland
- Voivodeship: Opole
- County: Krapkowice
- Gmina: Krapkowice

Population
  - Total: 1,300
- Website: http://zywocice.pl/

Żywocice [ʐɨvɔˈt͡ɕit͡sɛ] (German: Zywodczütz) is a village in the administrative district of Gmina Krapkowice, within Krapkowice County, Opole Voivodeship, in south-western Poland.

The village was first mentioned as Ziboczicz in 1300.

== Main sights ==
- old cemetery closed in 1934.
- old building of fire department (1885-1889) and fire truck from 1911.
- two old wayside shrines
- catholic church St. Florian built in 1989
