= Ligota, Opole Voivodeship =

Ligota
- Village
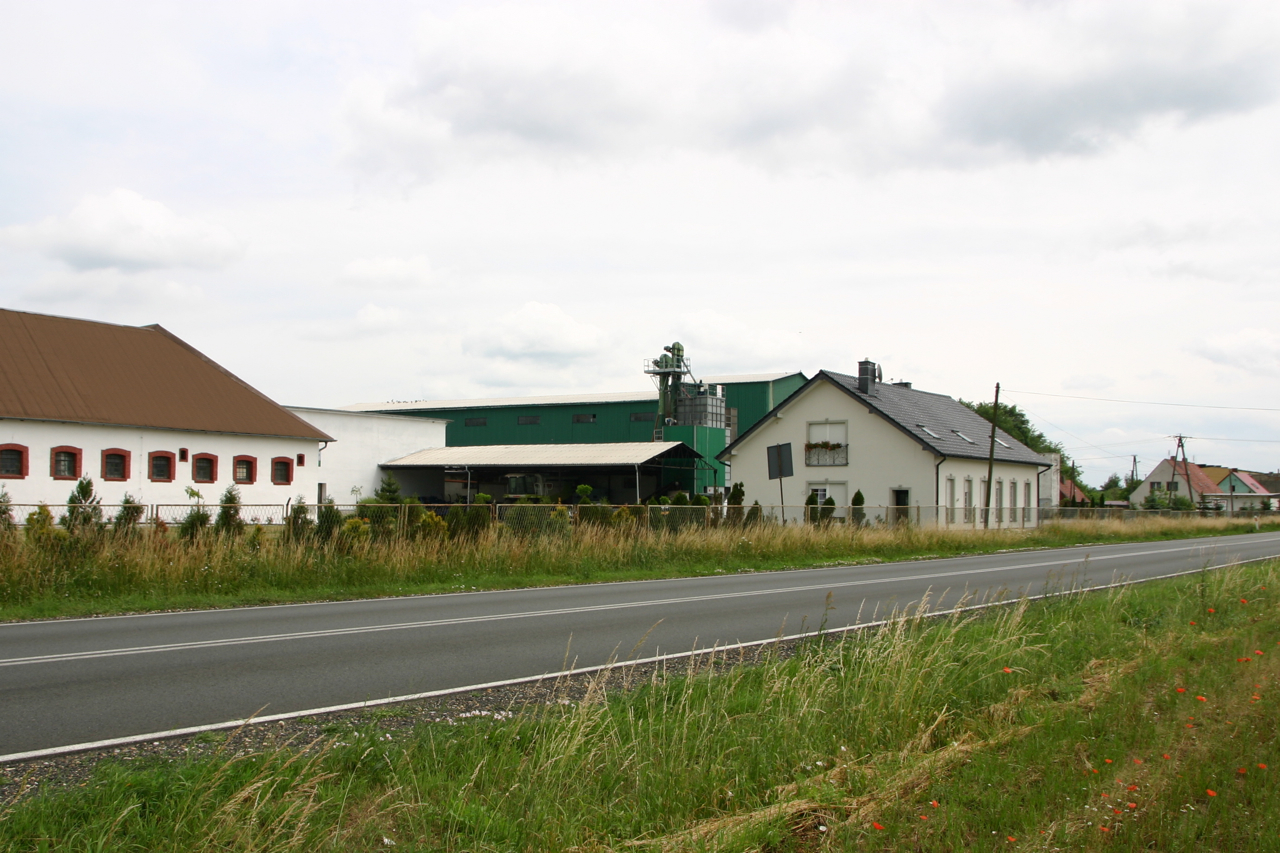

- Location within Poland
- Coordinates: 50°26′42″N 17°59′30″E
- Country: Poland
- Voivodeship: Opole
- County: Krapkowice
- Gmina: Krapkowice

Ligota [liˈɡɔta] (German: Ellguth) is a village in the administrative district of Gmina Krapkowice, within Krapkowice County, Opole Voivodeship, in south-western Poland.
