= Ściborowice =

Villages in Krapkowice County, Poland

- Village
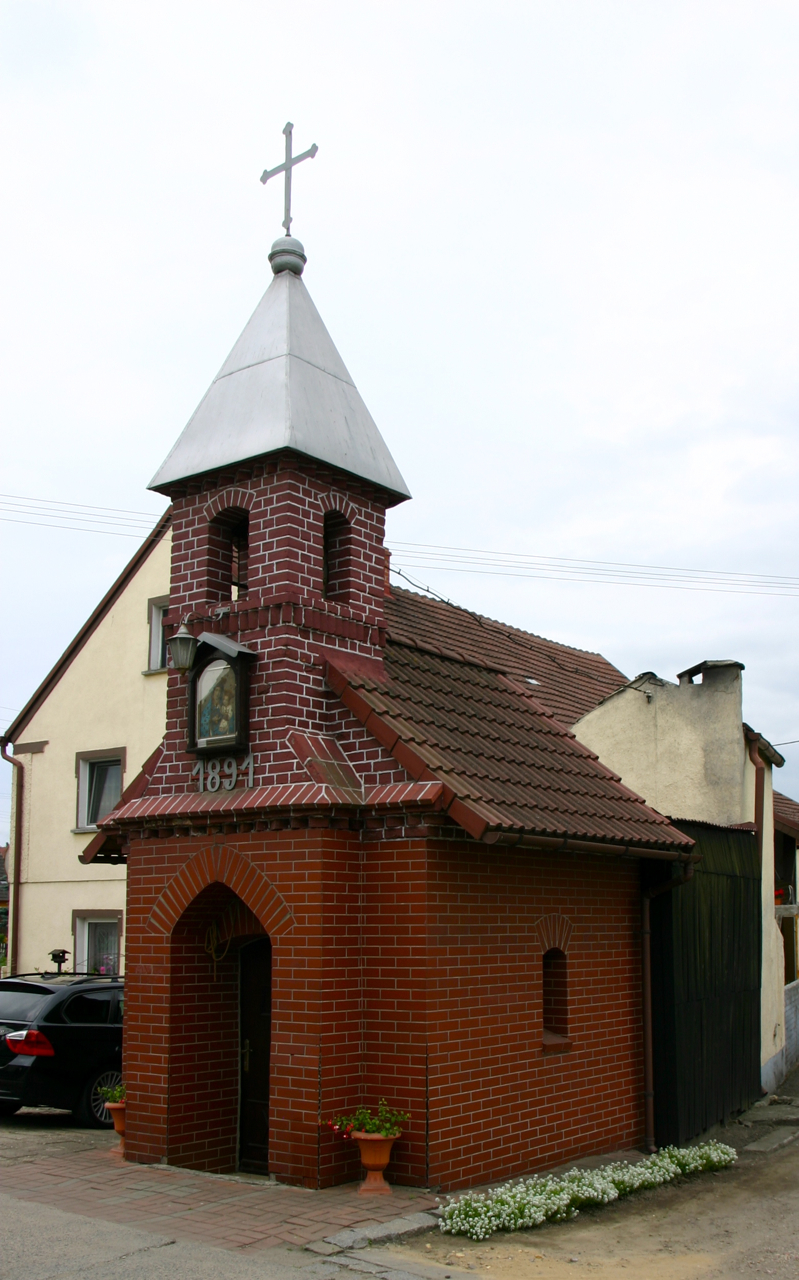
- Chapel in Ściborowice

- Location within Poland
- Coordinates: 50°25′50″N 17°55′17″E
- Country: Poland
- Voivodeship: Opole
- County: Krapkowice
- Gmina: Krapkowice
- First mentioned: ca. 1305
- Time zone: UTC+1 (CET)
  - Summer (DST): UTC+2 (CEST)
- Vehicle registration: OKR

Ściborowice [ɕt͡ɕibɔrɔˈvit͡sɛ] (German: Stiebendorf) is a village in the administrative district of Gmina Krapkowice, within Krapkowice County, Opole Voivodeship, in south-western Poland.

== History ==
The village was first mentioned in the Liber fundationis episcopatus Vratislaviensis from around 1305, when it was part of fragmented Piast-ruled Poland. Its name probably comes from the Old Polish male name Ścibor or Czcibor. Later on, the village was also part of Bohemia (Czechia), Prussia, and Germany. During World War II, the Germans operated the E26 forced labour subcamp of the Stalag VIII-B/344 prisoner-of-war camp in the village. After the defeat of Germany in the war, in 1945, the village became again part of Poland.

== See also ==
- Prudnik Land
