= Skała, Opole Voivodeship =

Skała
- Village
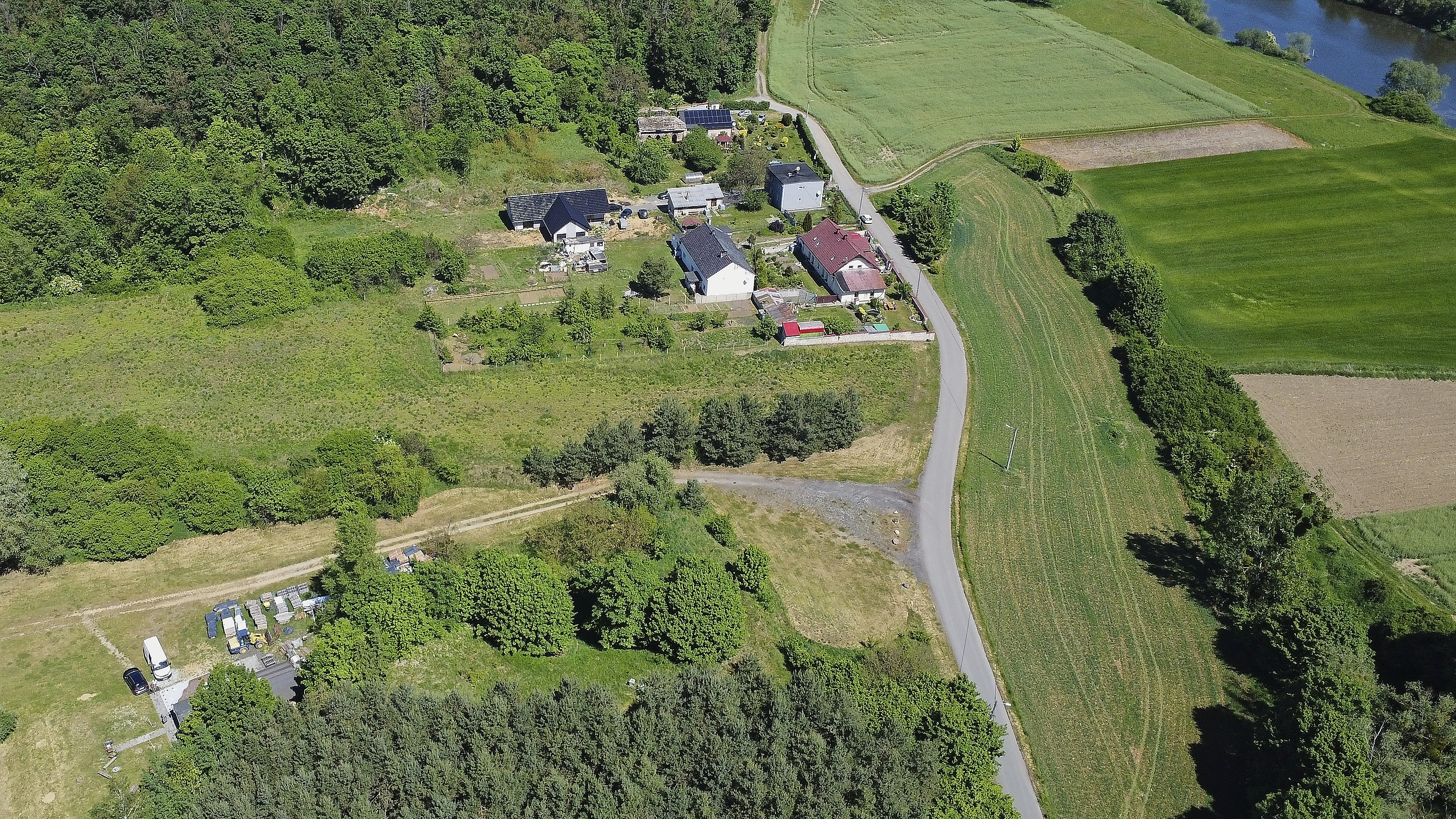

- Location within Poland
- Coordinates: 50°31′23″N 17°57′04″E
- Country: Poland
- Voivodeship: Opole
- County: Krapkowice
- Gmina: Krapkowice
- Time zone: UTC+1 (CET)
  - Summer (DST): UTC+2
- Postal code: 47-300
- Area code: +4877
- Vehicle registration: OKR

Skała is a village in the administrative district of Gmina Krapkowice, within Krapkowice County, Opole Voivodeship, south-western Poland.
