= Rogów Opolski =

- Village
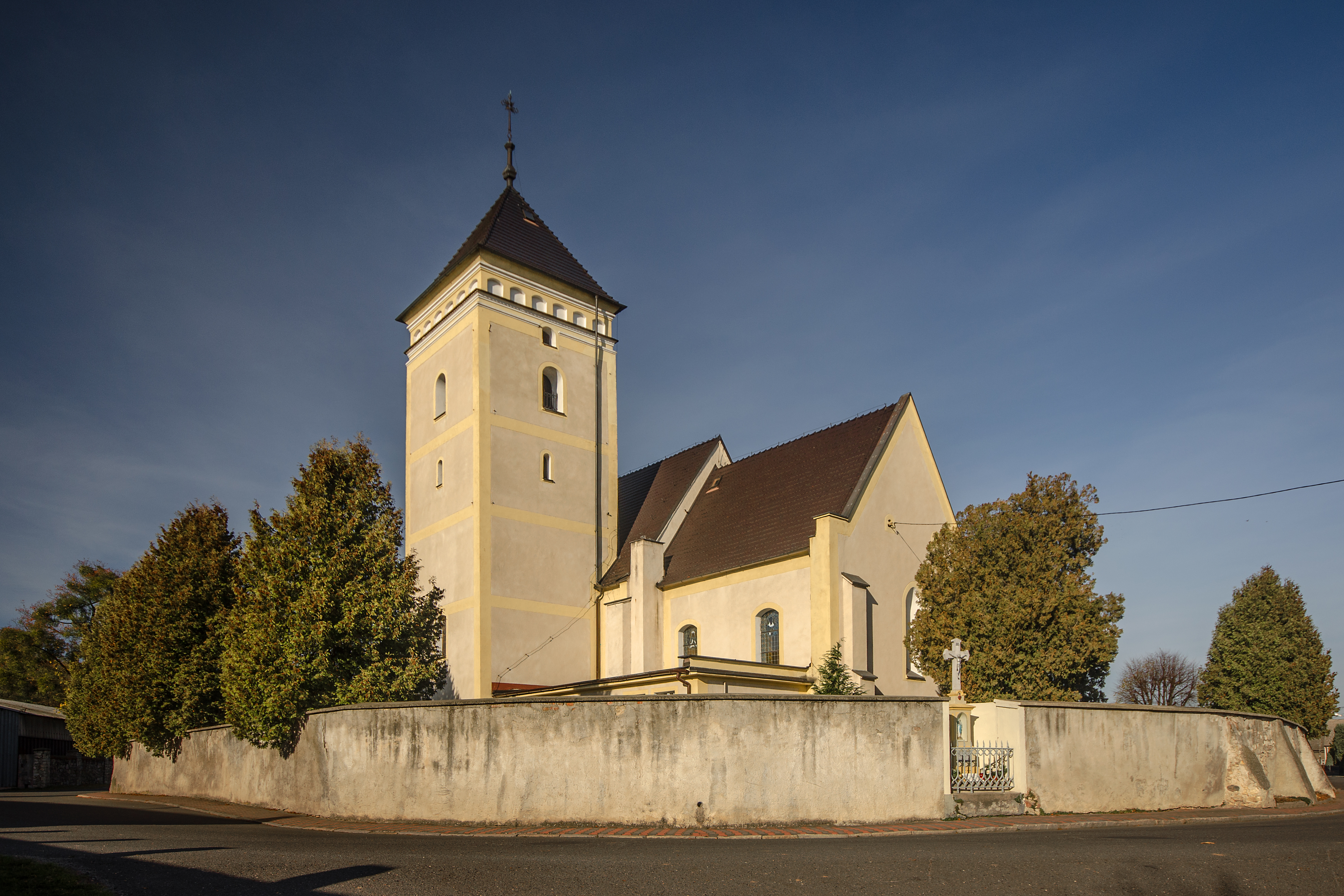
- Church of Saints Philip and James the Elder

- Location within Poland
- Coordinates: 50°31′N 17°56′E
- Country: Poland
- Voivodeship: Opole
- County: Krapkowice
- Gmina: Krapkowice

Rogów Opolski [ˈrɔɡuf ɔˈpɔlski] (German: Rogau) is a village in the administrative district of Gmina Krapkowice, within Krapkowice County, Opole Voivodeship, in south-western Poland.
