= Pietna =

- Village
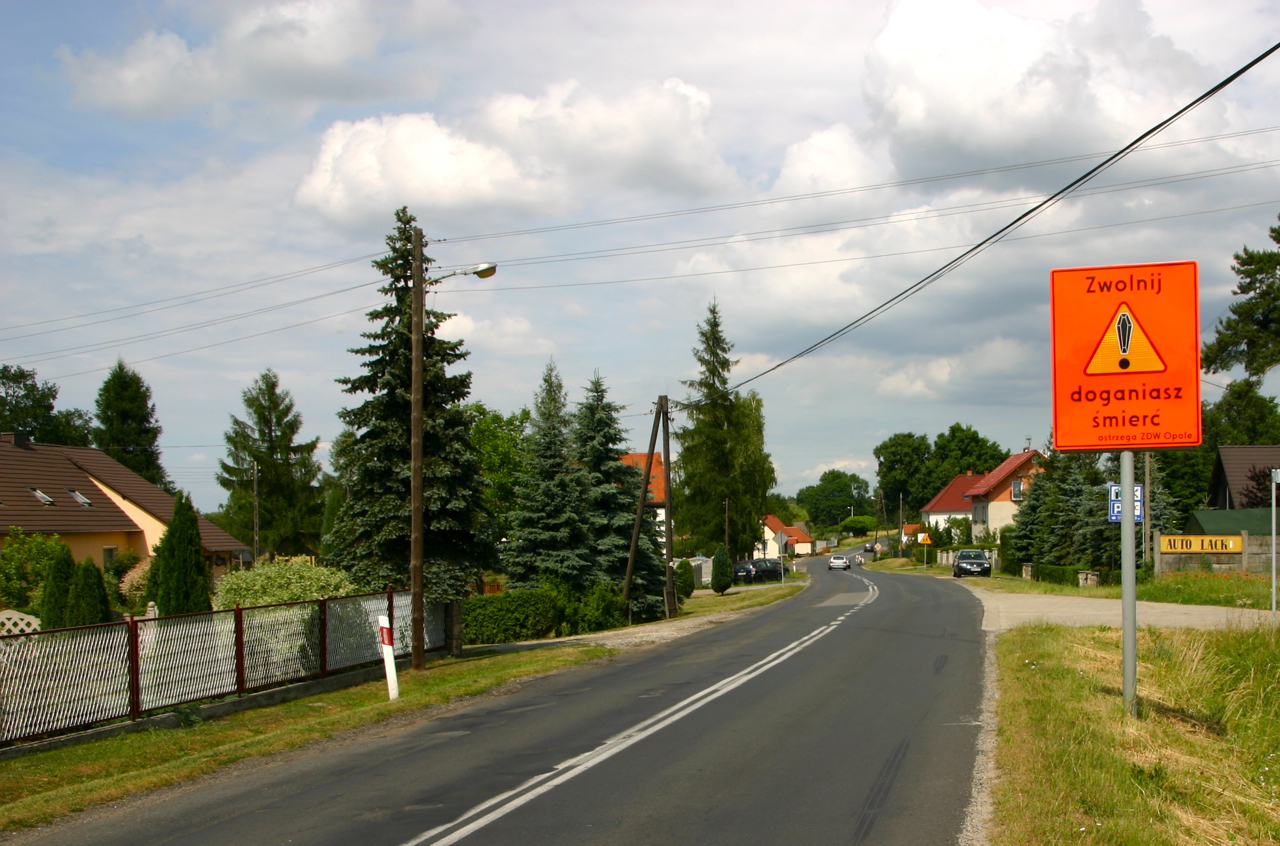

- Location within Poland
- Coordinates: 50°26′44″N 17°57′35″E
- Country: Poland
- Voivodeship: Opole
- County: Krapkowice
- Gmina: Krapkowice
- Website: http://www.pietna.eu

Pietna [ˈpjɛtna] is a village in the administrative district of Gmina Krapkowice, within Krapkowice County, Opole Voivodeship, in south-western Poland.

== Name ==
The village's name likely originates from a term meaning 'foothill/hill' or a location known for its drinking water sources. First recorded as Pietna in 1784, the village underwent several name changes. During the Nazi regime from 1936 to 1945, it was known as Teichgrund. Historical records also mention the village as Piethna and Pietien. On September 9, 1947, the village, then administratively part of Prudnik County, was officially named Pietna in Polish.

== See also ==
- Prudnik Land
