= Mionów =

Mionów Polnisch Müllmen
- Village
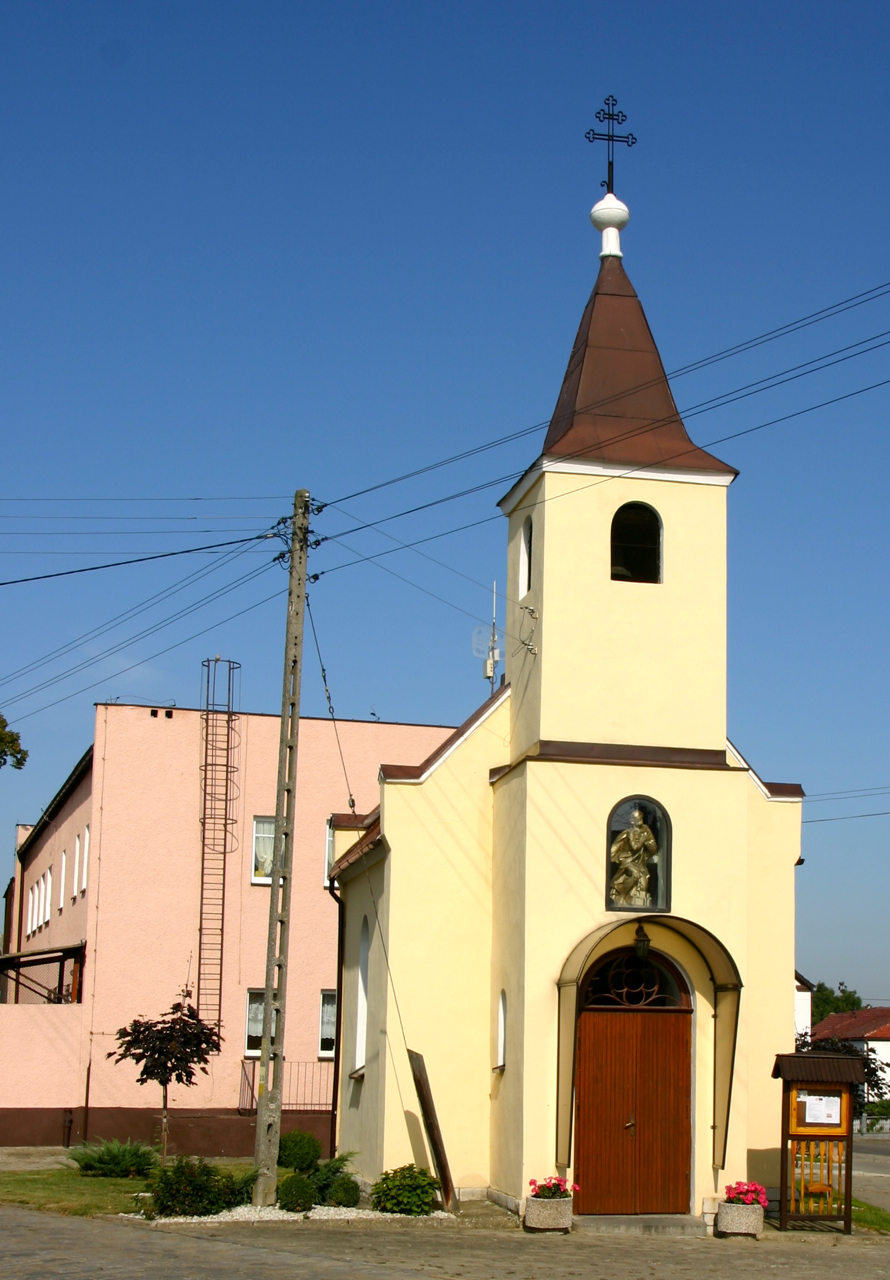
- Chapel in Mionów

- Location within Poland
- Coordinates: 50°22′49″N 17°47′26″E
- Country: Poland
- Voivodeship: Opole
- County: Prudnik
- Gmina: Głogówek
- Time zone: UTC+1 (CET)
  - Summer (DST): UTC+2 (CEST)
- Vehicle registration: OPR

Mionów ([ˈmjɔnuf]; additional name in German: Polnisch Müllmen) is a village in the administrative district of Gmina Głogówek, within Prudnik County, Opole Voivodeship, in southern Poland, close to the Czech border.

== History ==
It was also historically known in Polish as Miłonów and Miełonów. The adjacent settlement of Hojnowice formed part of Mionów. Under Nazi Germany, the village was renamed to Niederrode in Oberschlesien to erase traces of Polish origin.

Since 2009, in addition to the official Polish language, German has also been recognized as an additional secondary language.

== See also ==
- Prudnik Land
