= Bąków, Gmina Krapkowice =

Bąków
- Village
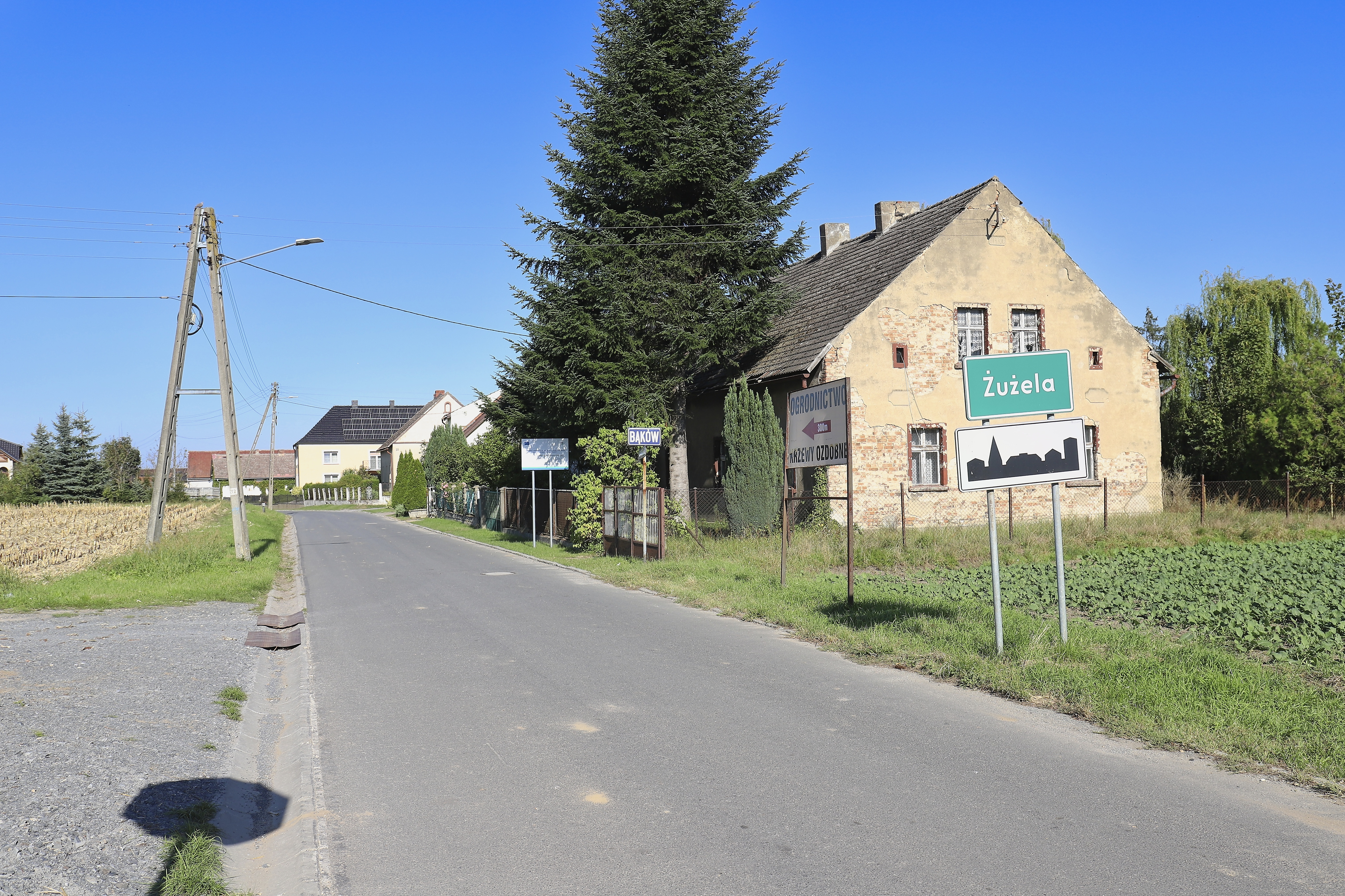

- Location within Poland
- Coordinates: 50°25′39″N 18°01′04″E
- Country: Poland
- Voivodeship: Opole
- County: Krapkowice
- Gmina: Krapkowice
- Time zone: UTC+1 (CET)
  - Summer (DST): UTC+2
- Postal code: 47-341
- Area code: +4877
- Vehicle registration: OKR

Bąków (German: Bunkow) is a village in the administrative district of Gmina Krapkowice, within Krapkowice County, Opole Voivodeship, south-western Poland.

== Etymology ==
The village was known as Bunkow in German. In 1936, Nazi administration of the German Reich changed the village's name to Wiesental. Following the Second World War, the Polish name Bąków was introduced by the Commission for the Determination of Place Names.
