= Steblów, Krapkowice County =

Steblów
- Village
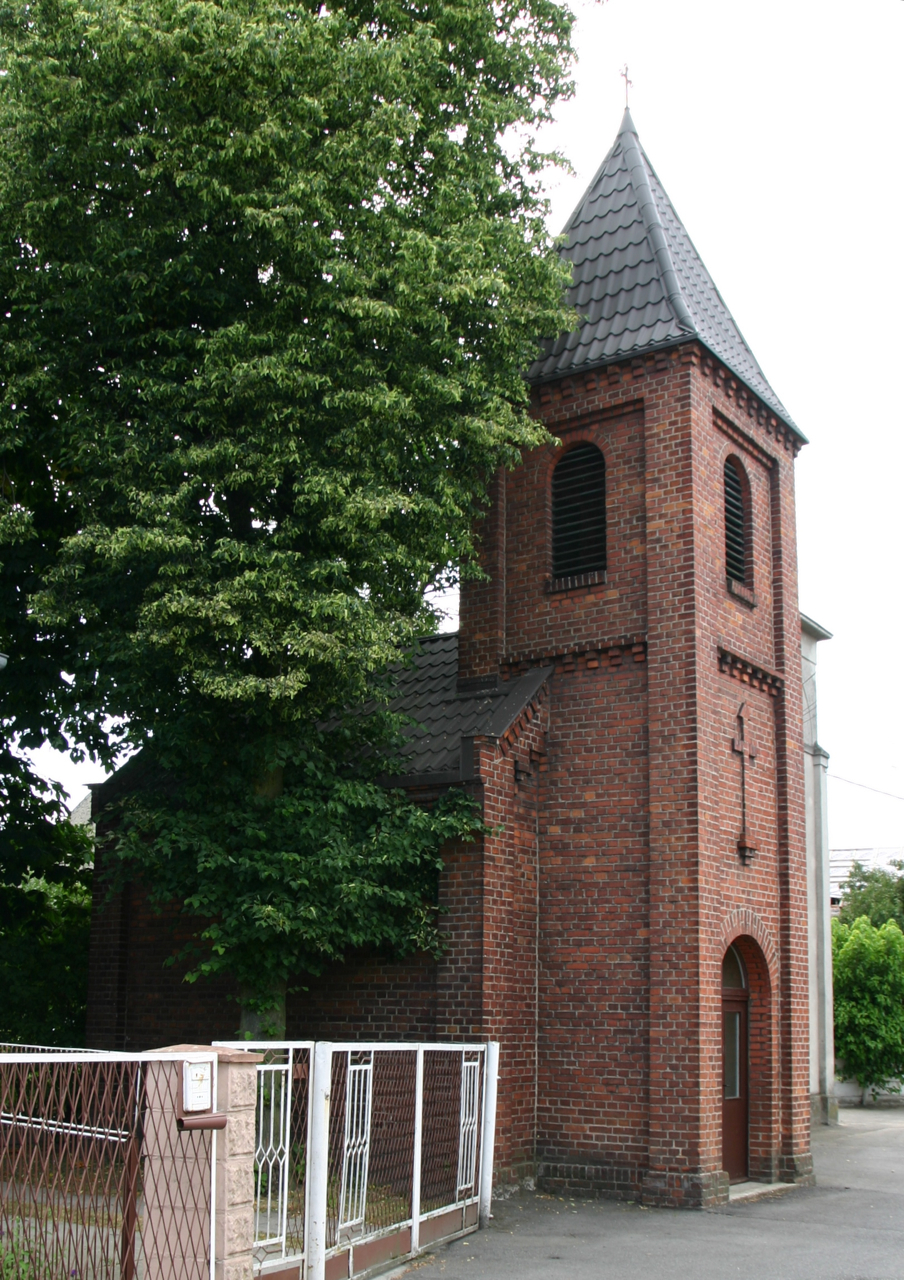

- Location within Poland
- Coordinates: 50°27′22″N 17°55′55″E
- Country: Poland
- Voivodeship: Opole
- County: Krapkowice
- Gmina: Krapkowice
- Population: 1,100

Steblów [ˈstɛbluf] (German: Stöblau) is a village in the administrative district of Gmina Krapkowice, within Krapkowice County, Opole Voivodeship, in south-western Poland.

== See also ==
- Prudnik Land
