= Jarczowice =

- Village
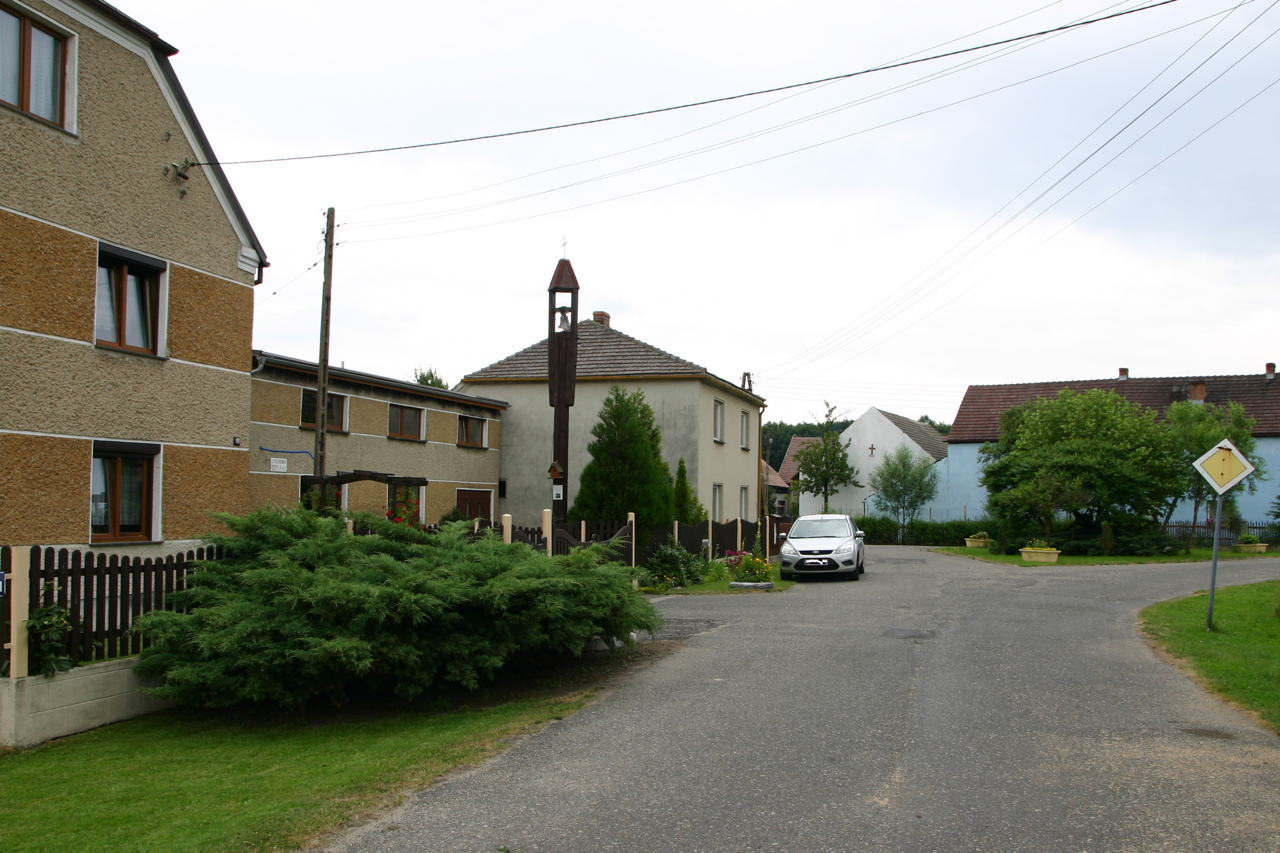

- Location within Poland
- Coordinates: 50°25′4″N 17°55′26″E
- Country: Poland
- Voivodeship: Opole
- County: Krapkowice
- Gmina: Krapkowice

Jarczowice [jart͡ʂɔˈvit͡sɛ] (German: Jarschowitz) is a village in the administrative district of Gmina Krapkowice, within Krapkowice County, Opole Voivodeship, in south-western Poland.
