= Jarnołtówek =

- Village
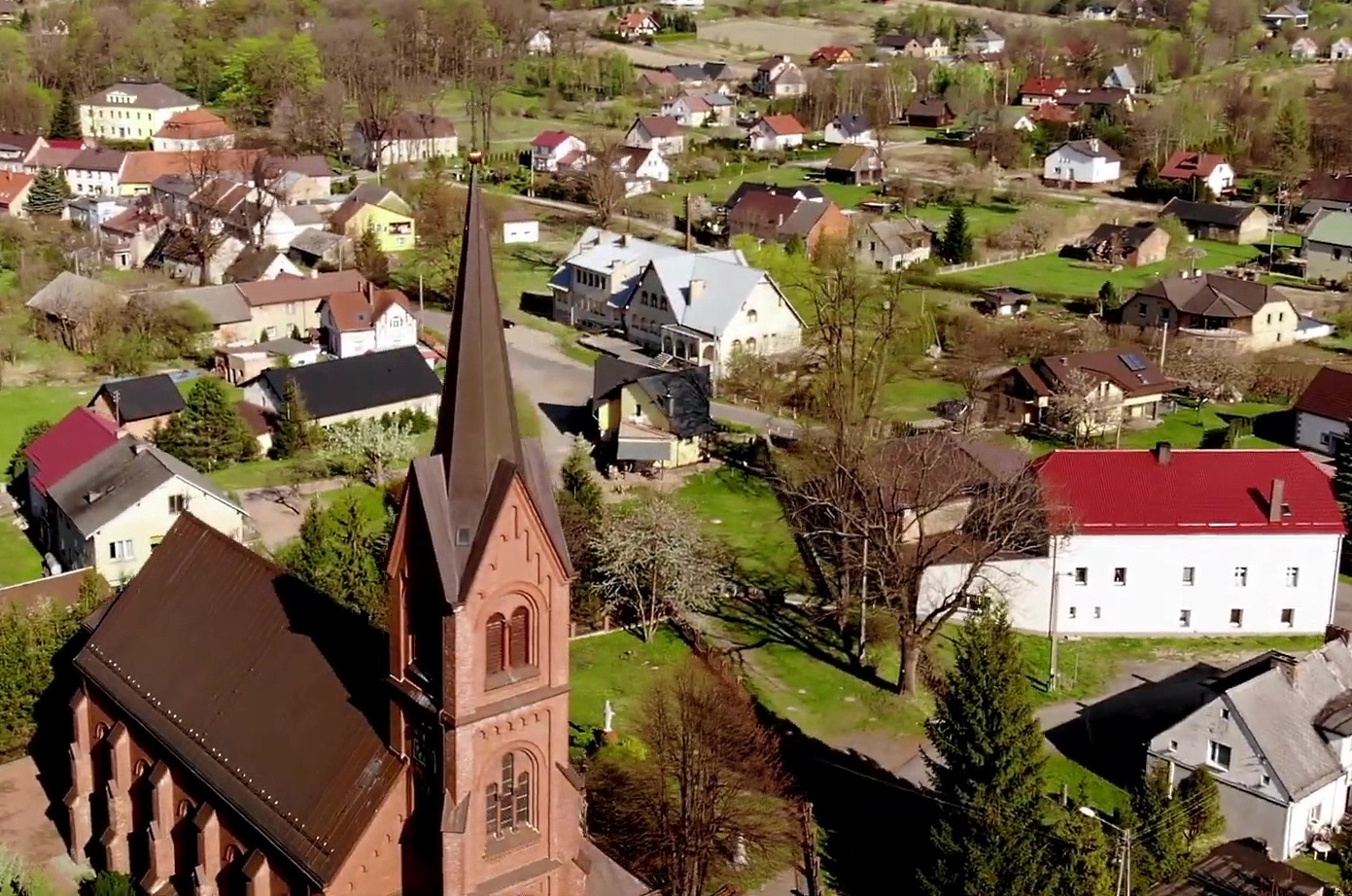
- Saint Bartholomew Church

- Location within Poland
- Coordinates: 50°17′5″N 17°25′29″E
- Country: Poland
- Voivodeship: Opole
- County: Nysa
- Gmina: Głuchołazy
- Population: 820
- Website: http://jarnoltowek.pl/

Jarnołtówek [jarnɔu̯ˈtuvɛk] (German: Arnoldsdorf) is a village in the administrative district of Gmina Głuchołazy, within Nysa County, Opole Voivodeship, south-western Poland. It is situated in the historical region of Prudnik Land. It lies approximately 6 km (4 mi) south-east of Głuchołazy, 12 km (7 mi) south-west of Prudnik, and 27 km (17 mi) south of Nysa.

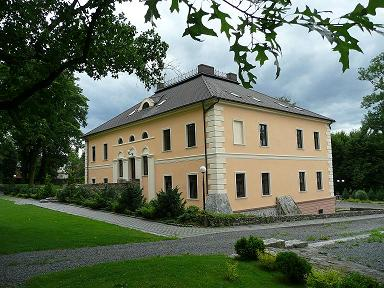
"Zameczek" estate

== Geography ==
The village is located in the southern part of Opole Voivodeship, close to the Czech Republic–Poland border. It is situated in the historical Prudnik Land region, as well as in Lower Silesia. It lies in the Opawskie Mountains, in the valley of Złoty Potok river. It sits in close proximity to the mountain of Biskupia Kopa.

== Places of interest ==
- the Saint Bartholomew church
- the dam
- the Opawskie Mountains Landscape Park
- the Biskupia Kopa mountain
- the mountain caves
- the restaurant "Włoski Smak"

== See also ==
- Prudnik Land
