= Nowy Dwór Prudnicki =

- Village
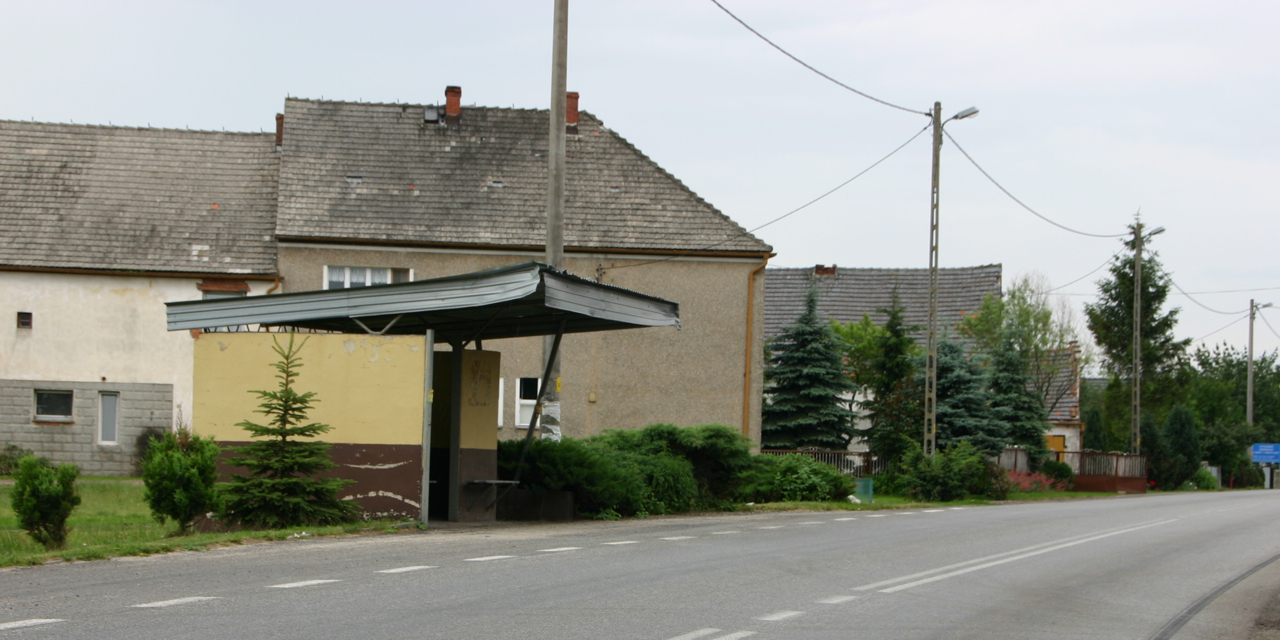

- Location within Poland
- Coordinates: 50°24′N 17°54′E
- Country: Poland
- Voivodeship: Opole
- County: Krapkowice
- Gmina: Krapkowice

Nowy Dwór Prudnicki [ˈnɔvɨ ˈdvur prudˈnit͡ski] (German: Neuhof) is a village in the administrative district of Gmina Krapkowice, in Krapkowice County, Opole Voivodeship, in south-western Poland.
