= Biskupia Kopa =

Mountain in the Opawskie Mountains

Biskupia Kopa / Biskupská kupa
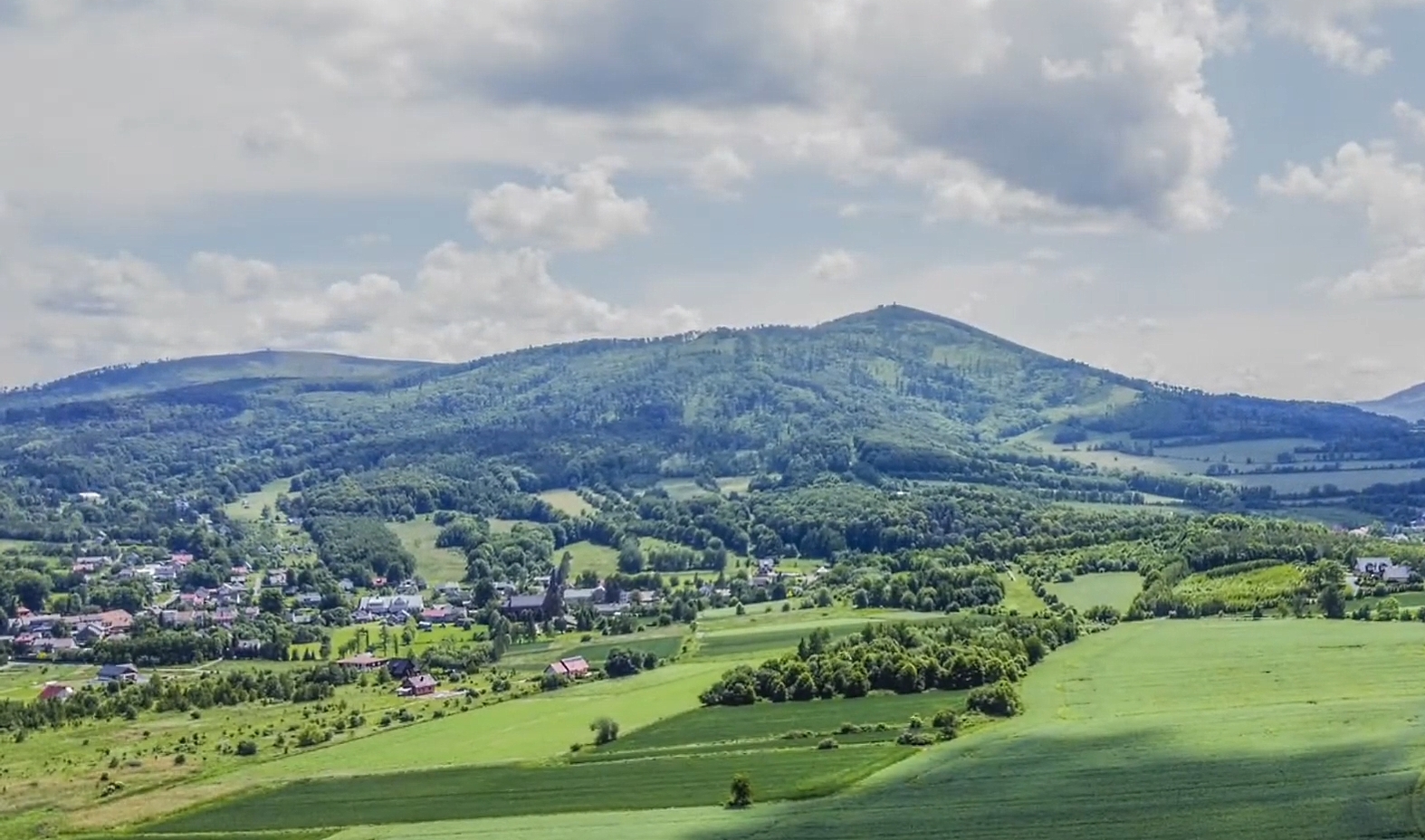
- Biskupia Kopa seen from Jarnołtówek

Highest point
- Elevation: 890 m (2,920 ft)
- Prominence: 174 m (571 ft)
- Isolation: 4.8 km (3.0 mi)
- Coordinates: 50°15′24″N 17°25′43″E

Naming
- English translation: bishop's mound
- Language of name: Polish

Geography
- Location within Opole Voivodeship Location within Poland Location within Czech Republic
- Location: Poland / Czech Republic
- Parent range: Opawskie Mountains

Biskupia Kopa (Czech: Biskupská kupa, German: Bischofskoppe) is a mountain in the crest of the Opawskie Mountains, eastern part of the Sudetes, lying on the border between Poland and the Czech Republic. It belongs to the Crown of Polish Mountains and is the highest reaching point of the Opole Voivodeship. It's about 13 kilometres (8 mi) away from the closest county town of Prudnik.

The Biskupia Kopa massif is built of Devonian sedimentary rocks – sandstone and slate. Many excavations in the area have remained after their exploitation, such as Gwarkowa Perć, Piekiełko, Morskie Oczko.
