= Gmina Krapkowice =

Gmina Krapkowice Krapkowice Commune
- Gmina
- Flag Coat of arms
- Interactive map of Gmina Krapkowice
- Coordinates (Krapkowice): 50°28′N 17°58′E
- Country: Poland
- Voivodeship: Opole
- County: Krapkowice
- Seat: Krapkowice

Area
  - Total: 97.44 km^{2} (37.62 sq mi)

Population (2019-06-30)
  - Total: 22,656
  - Density: 232.5/km^{2} (602.2/sq mi)
  - Urban: 16,301
  - Rural: 6,355
- Website: https://krapkowice.pl

Gmina Krapkowice is an urban-rural gmina (administrative district) in Krapkowice County, Opole Voivodeship, in south-western Poland. Its seat is the town of Krapkowice, which lies approximately 23 kilometres (14 mi) south of the regional capital Opole.

The gmina covers an area of 97.44 square kilometres (37.6 sq mi), and as of 2019, its total population was 22,656.

== Villages ==
Apart from the town of Krapkowice, Gmina Krapkowice contains the villages and settlements of Agnieszczyn, Bąków, Borek, Czekaj, Dąbrówka Górna, Gwoździce, Jarczowice, Kórnica, Ligota, Nowy Borek, Nowy Dwór Prudnicki, Pietna, Posiłek, Rogów Opolski, Ściborowice, Skała, Steblów, Wesoła, Wygon, Żużela, Żywocice.

== Neighbouring gminas ==
Gmina Krapkowice is bordered by the gminy of Głogówek, Gogolin, Strzeleczki, Walce and Zdzieszowice.

== Twin towns – sister cities ==
Gmina Krapkowice is twinned with:

- Camas, United States
- Ebersbach-Neugersdorf, Germany
- Hillsboro, United States
- Lipová-lázně, Czech Republic
- Morawica, Poland
- Partizánske, Slovakia
- Rohatyn, Ukraine
- Wissen, Germany
- Zabierzów, Poland
