= Prudnik Land =

Historical region of Poland

Prudnik Land ziemia prudnicka (Polish)
- Historical region
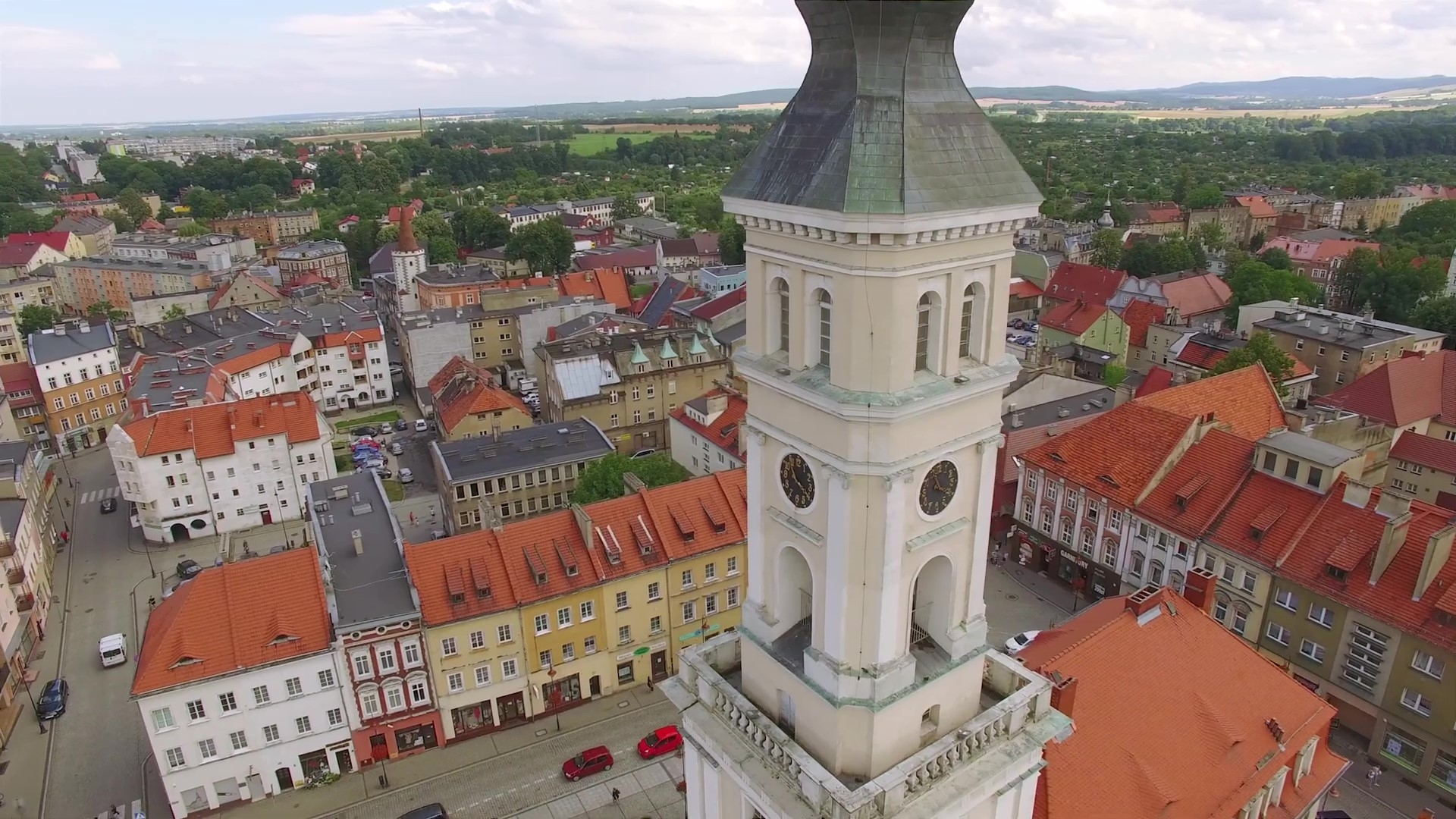
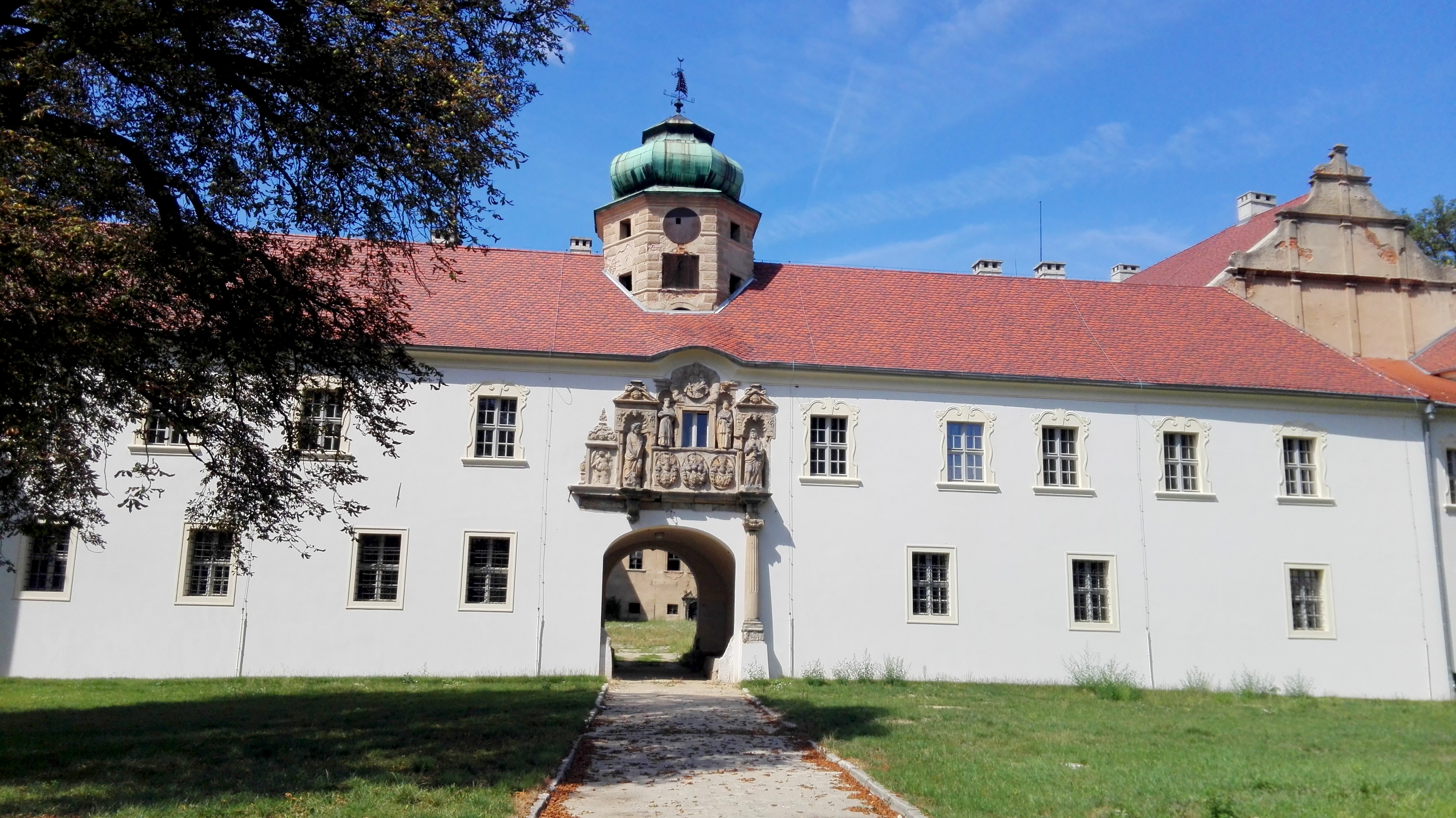
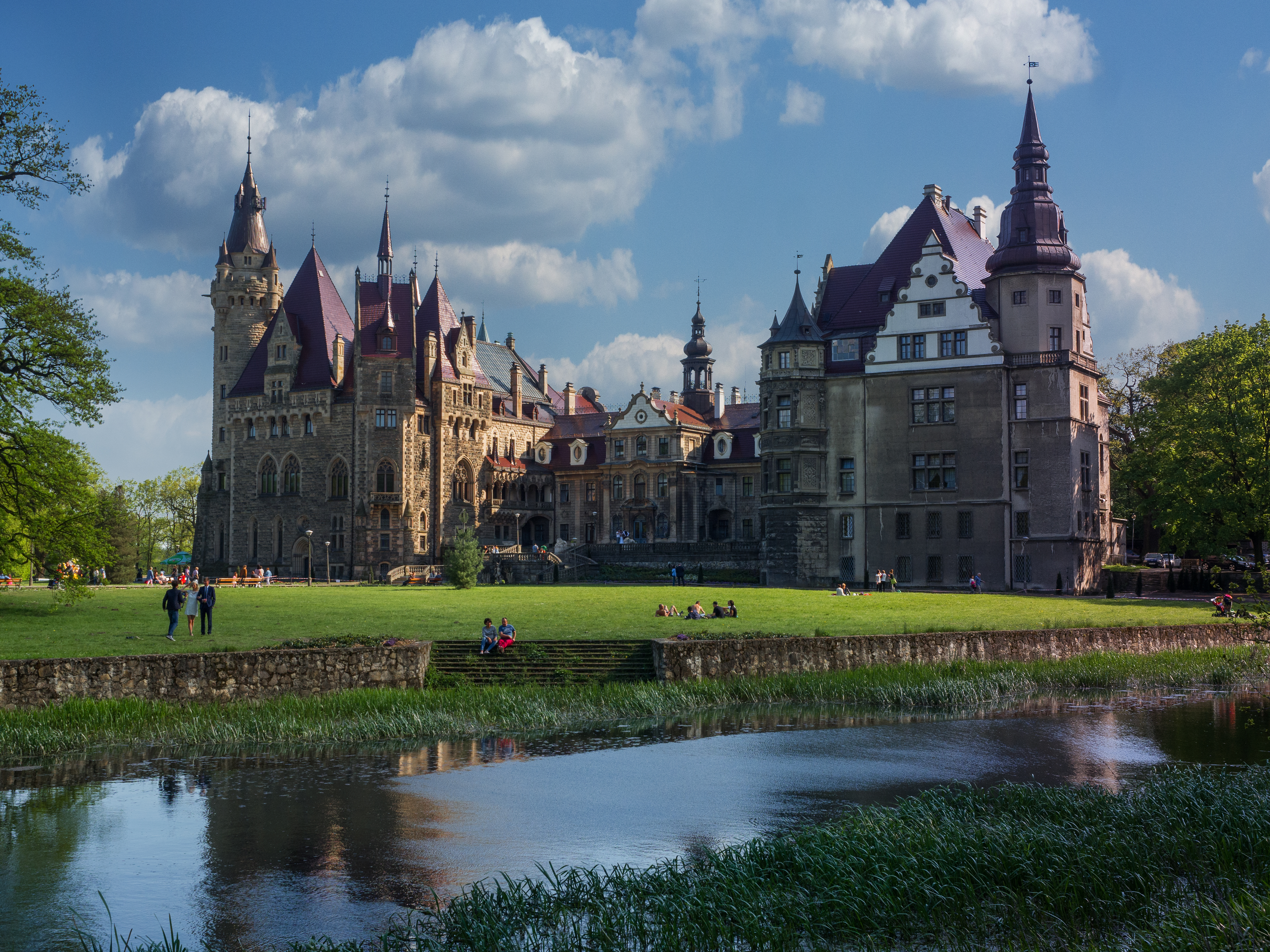
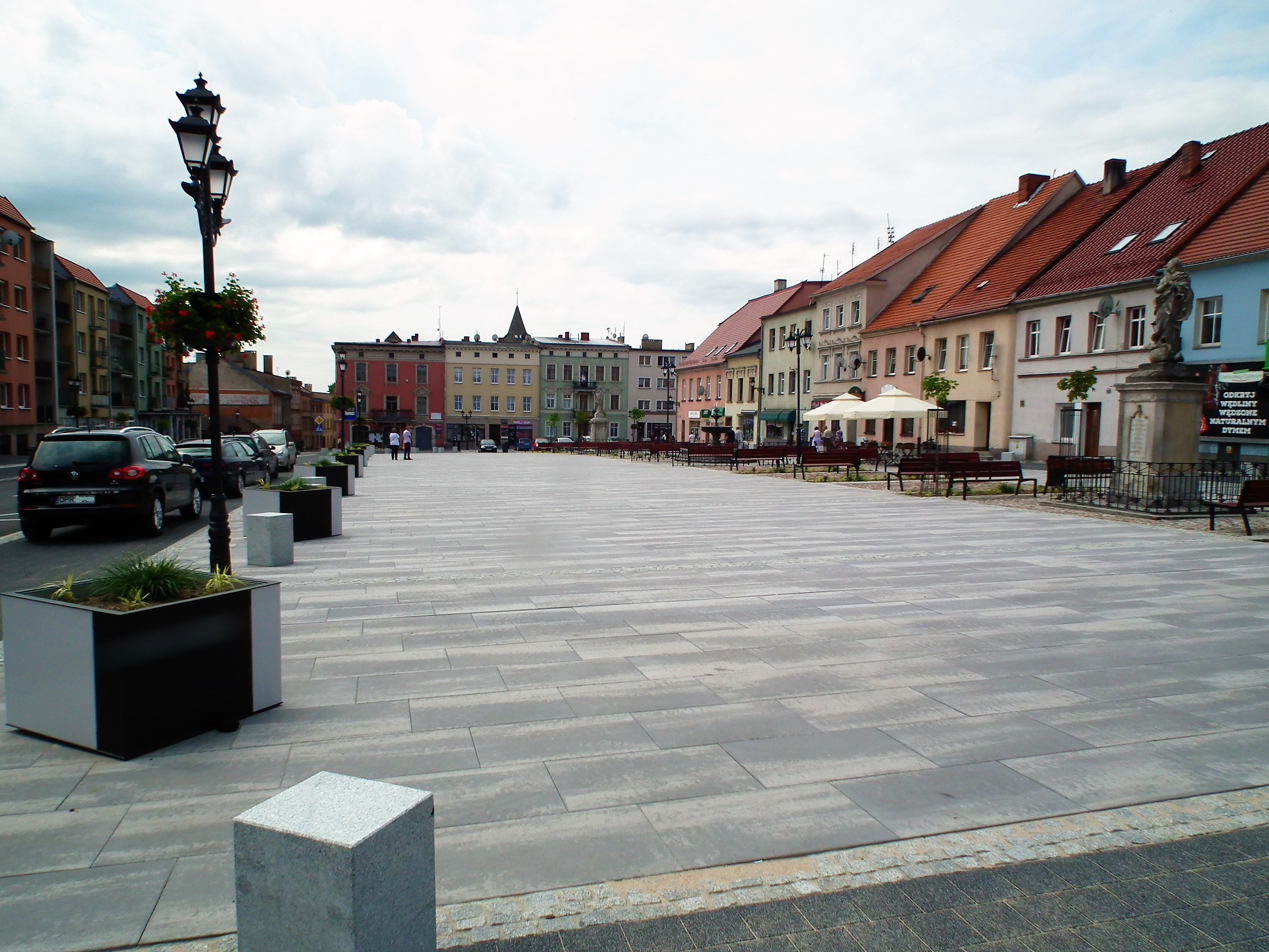
- From top, left to right: Prudnik; Głogówek Castle; Moszna Castle; Market Square in Biała

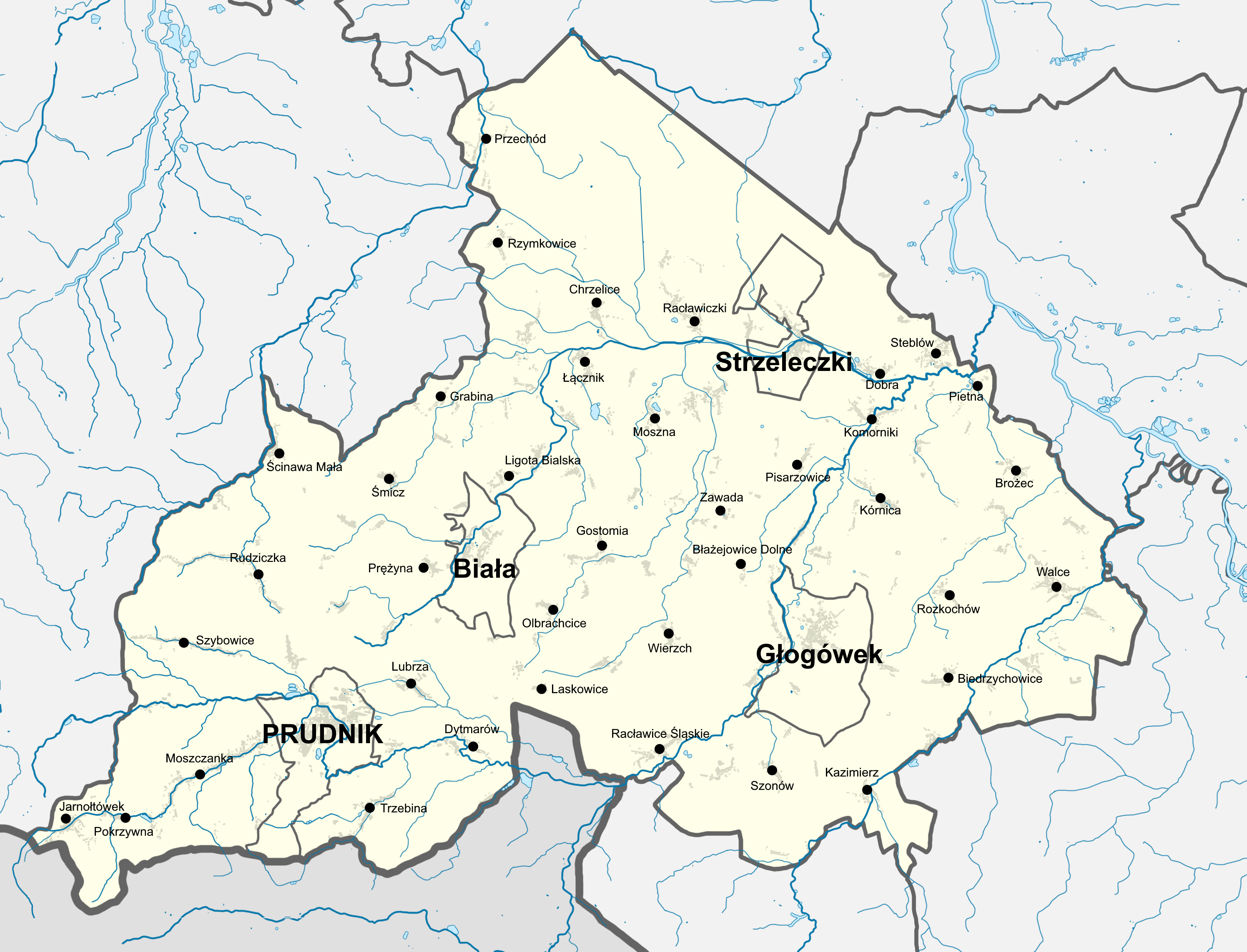
- Map of the Prudnik Land
- Coordinates: 50.31°N 17.57°E
- Country: Poland
- Historical region: Upper Silesia
- Largest city: Prudnik

Population
  - Total: 71,430
- Time zone: UTC+1 (CET)
  - Summer (DST): UTC+2 (CEST)

Prudnik Land (Polish: ziemia prudnicka, Silesian: Ziymia Prudnika, German: Neustädter Land) is a part of the historical region of Upper Silesia, in southern Poland. It is named after the town of Prudnik, the largest town in the region.

Towns located in the region are: Prudnik, Biała, Głogówek and Strzeleczki.

Throughout a large part of its history, the region had been ruled by the Duchy of Opole and other Silesian Duchies, formed as a result of the medieval fragmentation of Piast-ruled Poland. Following the Silesian Wars the region found itself within Prussia, and from 1871 it was also part of Germany. Following Germany's defeat in World War II in 1945, in accordance with the Oder–Neisse line, Prudnik Land became again part of Poland.

== Geography ==
Prudnik Land is located in the southwestern part of Upper Silesia, in the region known as Opolian Silesia, near the Czech Republic–Poland border. The western edge of the Prudnik Landmarks the border between historic Upper and Lower Silesia.

In the current administrative division, the Prudnik Land is located in the Opole Voivodeship. The current Prudnik County does not coincide with its borders. In addition to the entire area of Prudnik County (gminas of Prudnik, Lubrza, Głogówek and Biała), the Prudnik Land also includes the entire gmina Strzeleczki, gmina Walce excluding the village of Stradunia, the villages of Borek, Kórnica, Nowy Dwór Prudnicki, Pietna, Steblów and Ściborowice in gmina Krapkowice, villages Jarnołtówek and Pokrzywna in gmina Głuchołazy, villages Biernatów and Klisino, and villages Ścinawa Mała, Borek, Przechód and Rzymkowice in gmina Korfantów.

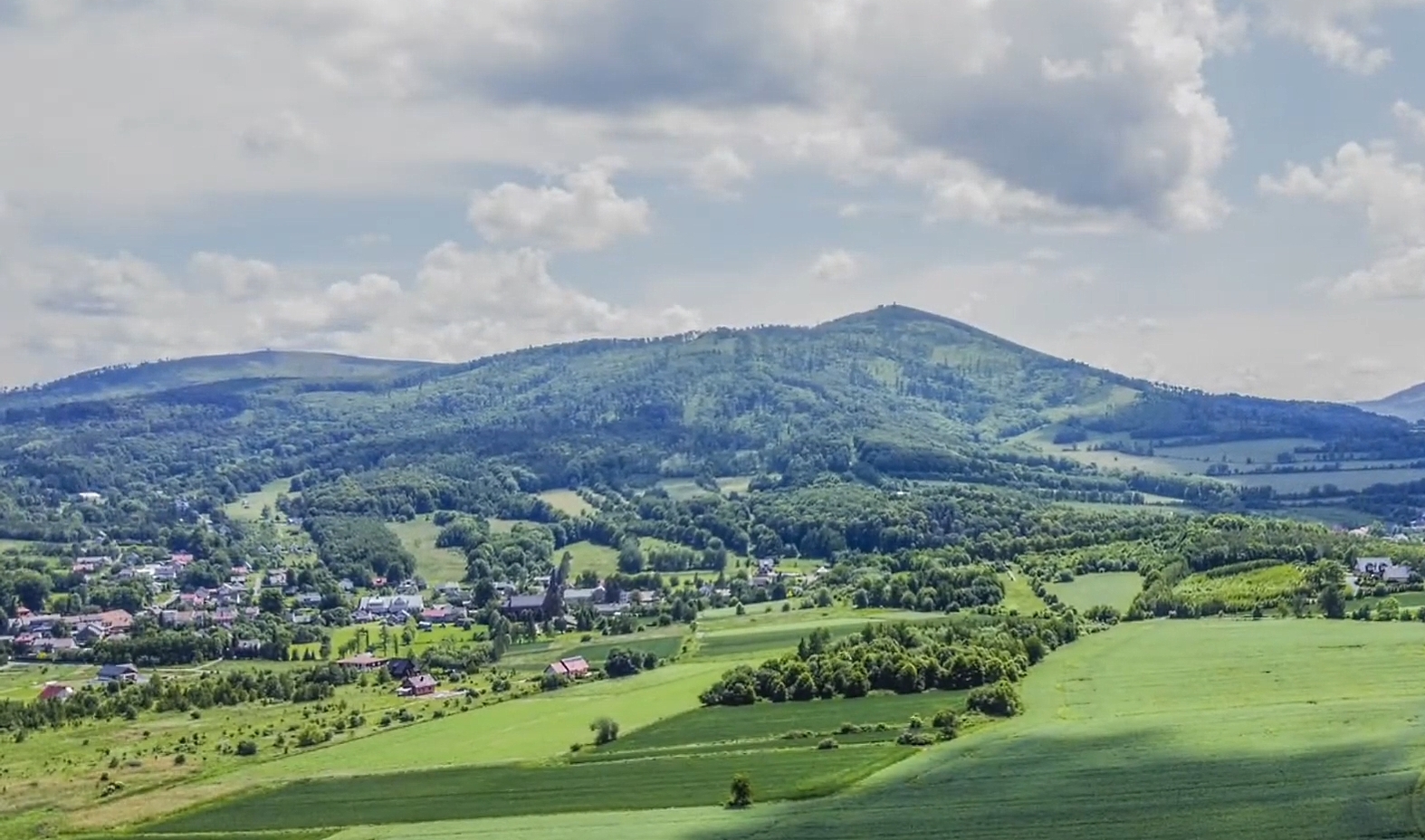
Biskupia Kopa

The southwestern part of the Prudnik Land is located in the Opawskie Mountains (Eastern Sudetes). Mountains can be found in the vicinity of Prudnik, Jarnołtówek, Pokrzywna, Moszczanka, Wieszczyna, Dębowiec and Trzebina. The highest mountains in the Prudnik Land are: Biskupia Kopa (890 m), Srebrna Kopa (785 m) and Zamkowa Góra (571 m). The area around Głogówek and Strzeleczki is mostly flat land. The area near Biała is characterized by numerous hills. Most of the Prudnik Land is occupied by fertile soils. The most fertile soils are located in the vicinity of Wierzch, southwest of Głogówek and near Biała. The least fertile soils are found near the villages of Dobra, Steblów, Wawrzyńcowice, Mokra, Brzeźnica.
