= Krapkowice County =

Krapkowice County Powiat krapkowicki
- County
- Location within the voivodeship
- Coordinates (Krapkowice): 50°28′N 17°58′E
- Country: Poland
- Voivodeship: Opole
- Seat: Krapkowice
- Gminas: Total 5: Gmina Gogolin; Gmina Krapkowice; Gmina Strzeleczki; Gmina Walce; Gmina Zdzieszowice

Government
  - Head of County: Maciej Sonik

Area
  - Total: 442.35 km^{2} (170.79 sq mi)

Population (2019-06-30)
  - Total: 63,857
  - Density: 144.36/km^{2} (373.89/sq mi)
  - Urban: 34,428
  - Rural: 29,429
- Car plates: OKR
- Website: www.powiatkrapkowicki.pl

Krapkowice County (Polish: powiat krapkowicki) is a unit of territorial administration and local government (powiat) in Opole Voivodeship, south-western Poland. It came into being on January 1, 1999, as a result of the Polish local government reforms passed in 1998. Its administrative seat and largest town is Krapkowice, which lies 23 kilometres (14 mi) south of the regional capital Opole. The county also contains the towns of Zdzieszowice, lying 13 km (8 mi) south-east of Krapkowice, and Gogolin, 5 km (3 mi) north-east of Krapkowice.

The county covers an area of 442.35 square kilometres (170.8 sq mi). As of 2006 its total population is 67,926, out of which the population of Krapkowice is 16,301, that of Zdzieszowice is 11,445, that of Gogolin is 6,682, and the rural population is 29,429.

== Neighbouring counties ==
Krapkowice County is bordered by Opole County to the north, Strzelce County to the east, Kędzierzyn-Koźle County to the south-east and Prudnik County to the west.

== Administrative division ==
The county is subdivided into five gminas (three urban-rural and two rural). These are listed in the following table, in descending order of population.

Gmina	Type	Area (km^{2})	Population (2019)	Seat
Gmina Krapkowice	urban-rural	97.4	22,656	Krapkowice
Gmina Zdzieszowice	urban-rural	57.9	15,740	Zdzieszowice
Gmina Gogolin	urban-rural	100.5	12,632	Gogolin
Gmina Strzeleczki	rural	117.3	7,391	Strzeleczki
Gmina Walce	rural	69.3	5,438	Walce
