= Duchy of Głogówek and Prudnik =

Silesian duchy (1401–1562)

Duchy of Głogówek and Prudnik Księstwo głogówecko-prudnickie (Polish) Hornohlohovsko-prudnické knížectví (Czech) Herzogtum Klein Glogau und Prudnik (German)
- 1401–1562
- Coat of arms

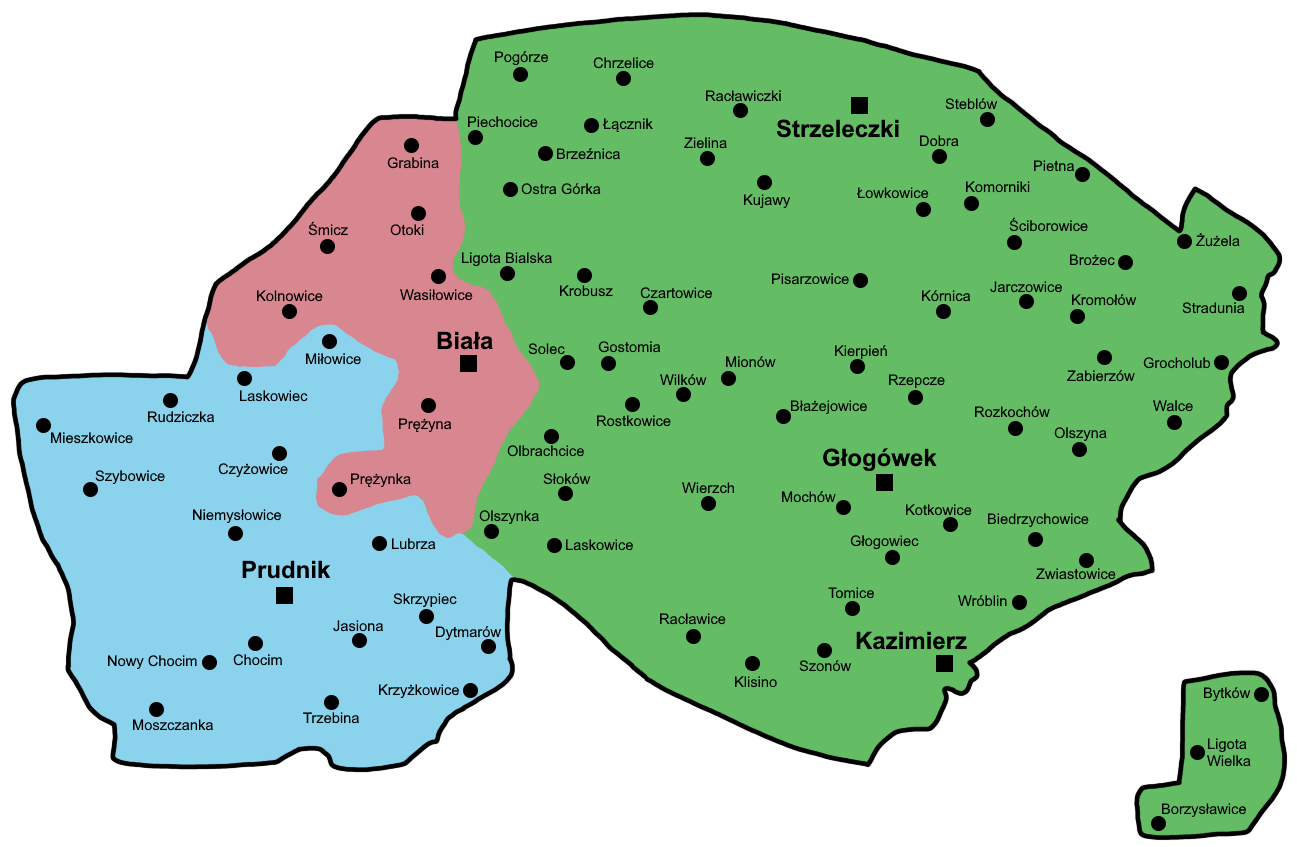
- Status: Silesian duchy
- Capital: Głogówek
- Largest city: Prudnik
- Historical era: Middle Ages
  - Partitioned from Opole: 1401
  - Annexed by Opole and Racibórz: 1562
Preceded by	Succeeded by
Duchy of Opole	Duchy of Opole and Racibórz
- Today part of: Poland

The Duchy of Głogówek and Prudnik (Polish: Księstwo głogówecko-prudnickie; Czech: Hornohlohovsko-prudnické knížectví; German: Herzogtum Klein Glogau und Prudnik) was one of the duchies of Silesia ruled by the branch of Polish Piast dynasty, formed during the medieval fragmentation of Poland into provincial duchies. Its capital was Głogówek in Prudnik Land.

== History ==
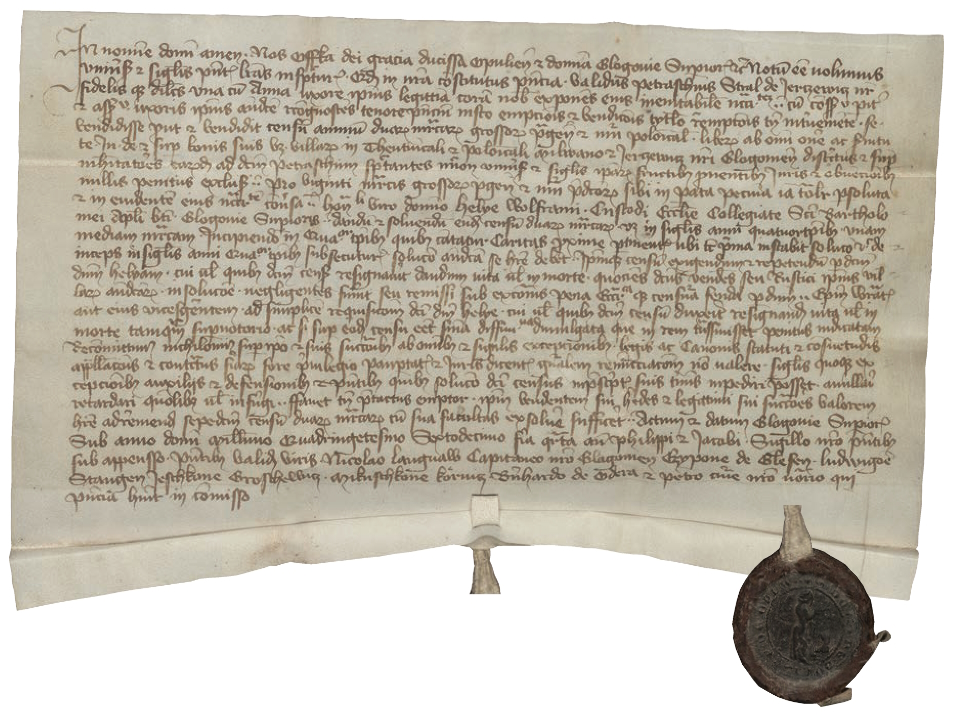
Document issued by Duchess Euphemia in 1416

In the beginning of the 15th century, the Duchy of Opole was partially divided into smaller duchies for members of the Opole Piasts family. After the death of Duke Vladislaus II of Opole on 18 May 1401, Głogówek became a dower of Duchess Euphemia of Masovia. Her reign marked the beginning of the Duchy of Głogówek. Following Duchess Euphemia's death in 1418, the Głogówek district was divided between Dukes Bolko IV of Opole and Bernard of Niemodlin. The first document issued in Głogówek by both Bolko IV and Bernard was dated 12 October 1418. In 1421, they took possession of Prudnik under a lien.

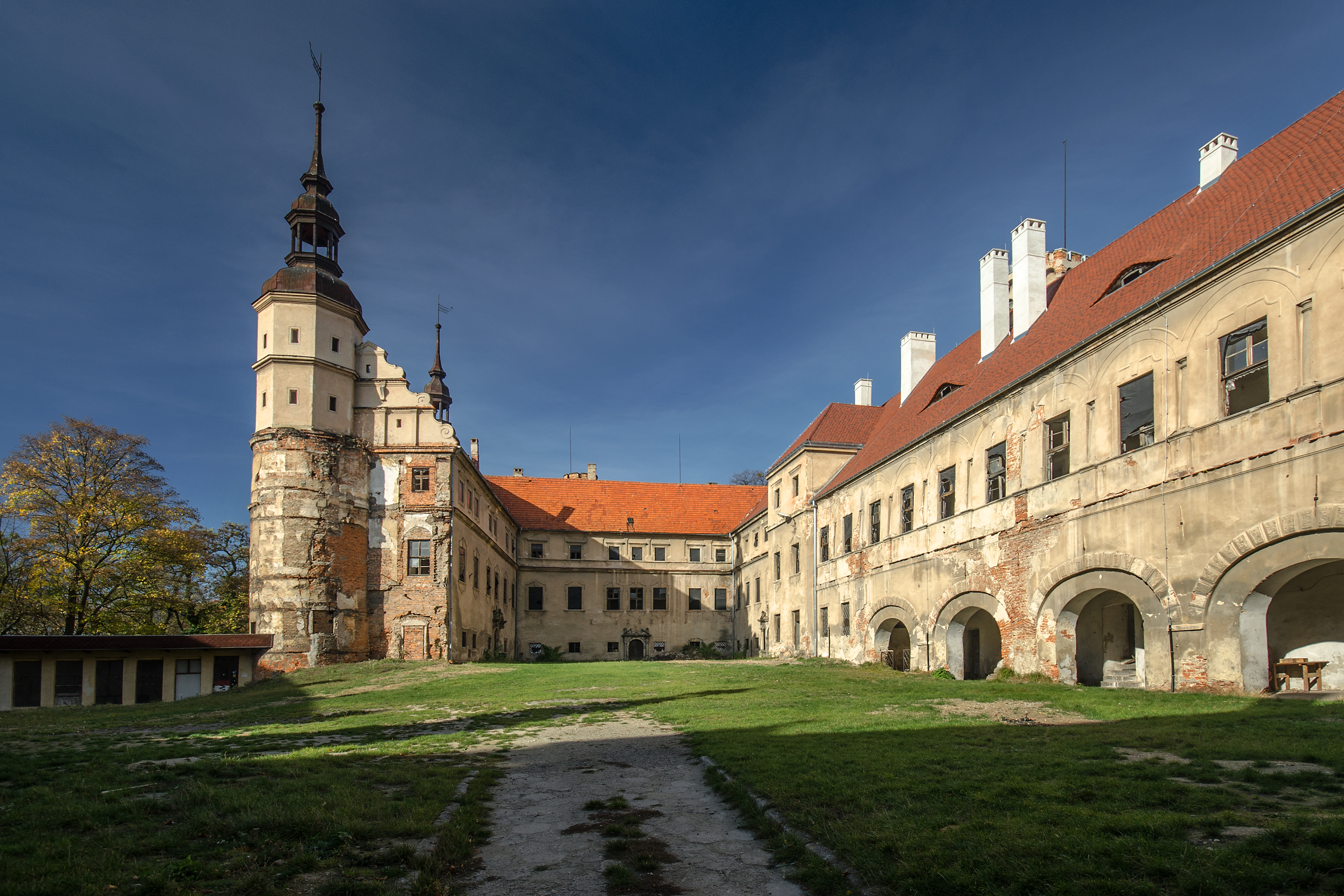
Głogówek Castle

In 1425, Bolko IV passed his rights to the town of Prudnik to his son Bolko V. In 1426, Bolko V received the rights to a part of the Głogówek district and to a half of Krapkowice and Chrzelice. The first surviving document in which Bolko V is mentioned as the ruler of Prudnik was dated 6 May 1425. His wife, Elizabeth (stepdaughter to King Władysław II Jagiełło), was mentioned as the Duchess of Głogówek on 5 February 1427. On 17 June 1427, Bolko V received Duke Bernard's part of the territory. The town of Biała also found itself in Bolko V's duchy.

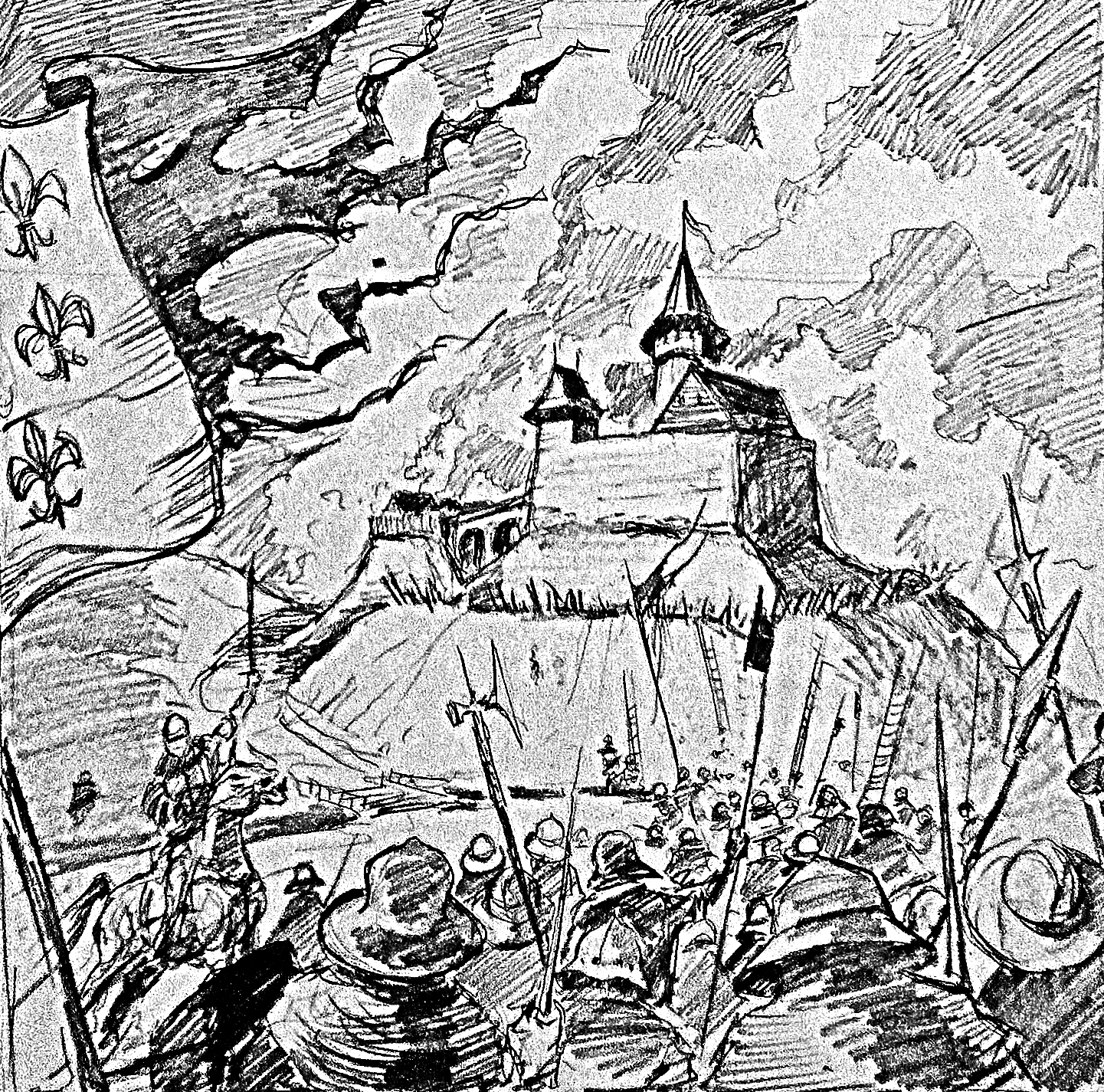
Hussites attacking the Prudnik Castle

The duchy was heavily damaged during the Hussite Wars. The Hussites invaded the Duchy of Głogówek and Prudnik in Spring of 1428. The pillaged the towns of Prudnik, Głogówek, Kazimierz, Strzeleczki, and Biała. The also destroyed multiple villages, including Nowy Browiniec, Laskowice, Dobra, Brożec, Rozkochów, Walce, Chrzelice. Duke Bolko V decided to join the Hussites. He secularized the Catholic Church's properties in his duchy and started plundering the territories of the Bishop of Wrocław. In revenge, army of the Duchy of Nysa invaded Prudnik and destroyed the Gryżów castle in Piorunkowice. Bolko V started attacking Silesian towns and villages, looting them and holding the residents for ransom. He conquered a significant part of the Duchy of Krnov and incorporated it into the Duchy of Głogówek and Prudnik. In 1433, the army of the Duchy of Głogówek and Prudnik, commanded by Bolko V, took part in the siege of Żory and in the battle of Rybnik.

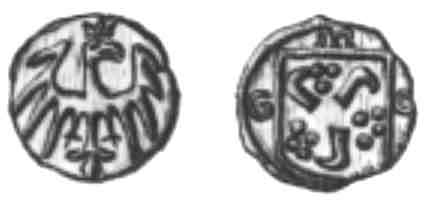
Heller of the Duchy of Głogówek and Prudnik

The Duchy of Głogówek and Prudnik issued its own coins, used mainly in the Kingdom of Poland. The hellers were minted from 1436 to 1438 in Głogówek. Bolko V stopped minting them due to complaints from neighbouring countries, because due to the Głogówek and Prudnik coins being of poor quality, the Duke was accused of "flooding the marked with fake money".

In 1440, Duke Bolko V took over the Edelštejn district, along with the town of Zlaté Hory. In 1443, he took over Ujazd and villages in the area of Bytom. In the years 1445–1450, the Duke owned the town of Głuchołazy. In 1456, Bolko V acquired a part of the Duchy of Troppau.

In 1458, Duke Bolko V of Głogówek and Prudnik was the first Silesian due to pay homage to King George of Poděbrady. Bolko V died in May 1460. Because he had no children, the fate of the Duchy of Głogówek and Prudnik was to be decided by the King of Bohemia. According to the chronicles written by Jan Długosz, King George of Poděbrady made an unsuccessful attempt to directly incorporate the Duchy of Głogówek and Prudnik into the Bohemian Crown. In the name of Duke Nicholas I of Opole, a delegation of knights from the duchies of Głogówek and Strzelce arrived in Prague. Among them was Piotr Przedbor of Sierakowice, Konrad Unyeg of Jasiona, and the duke scrivener Wacław. On 16 August 1460, King George's verdict was announced. In accordance to it, the Duchy of Głogówek and Prudnik was awarded to Duke Nicholas I. Territories conquered by Bolko V were returned to their rightful owners.

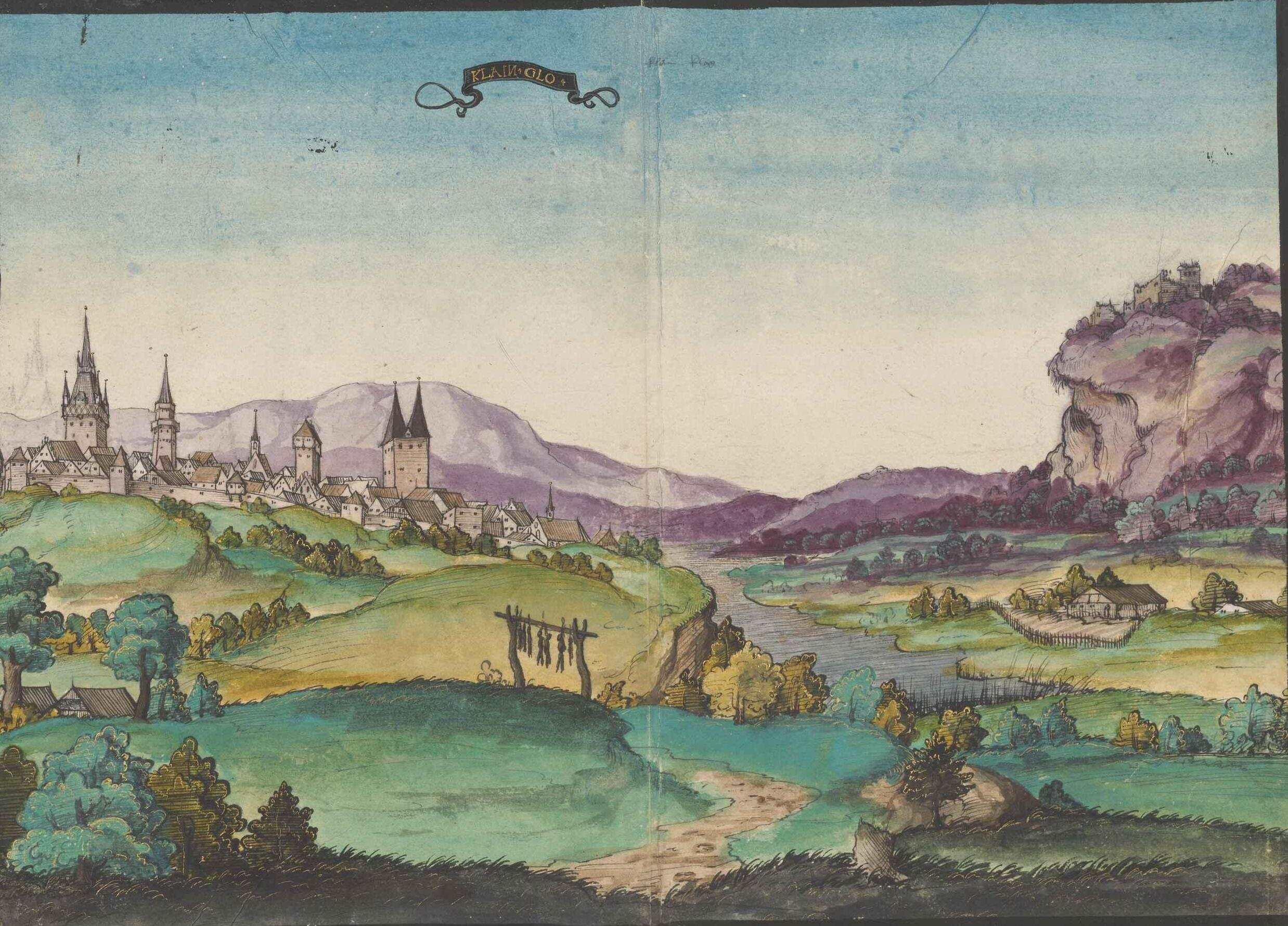
Panoramic view of Głogówek in 1537

Based on the titulatures of Dukes Nicholas II of Niemodlin and Jan II the Good, Roman Sękowski claimed that, unlike the Duchy of Niemodlin and the Duchy of Strzelce, the Duchy of Głogówek and Prudnik did not lose the status of a standalone duchy. It was not incorporated into the Duchy of Opole and remained autonomous until 1562. Analyzing the last will of Nicholas II, "it seems that the duke ruled Głogówek on his own". Jan II was a "fully independent ruler of the Duchy of Opole and Głogówek". Holy Roman Emperor Ferdinand I, while issuing the Zřizeni ordinance in 1562, titled himself as the Duke of Opole, Racibórz, and Głogówek (after the ordinance was approved, his title was Duke of Opole and Racibórz). The meeting, during which the Emperor signed the ordinance, was attended by representatives of the Duchy of Głogówek and Prudnik: Sebastian Stolz of Gostomia (owner of Kotkowice) and Krzysztof Warkotsch of Nobszyce (owner of Zwiastowice).

== Territory ==
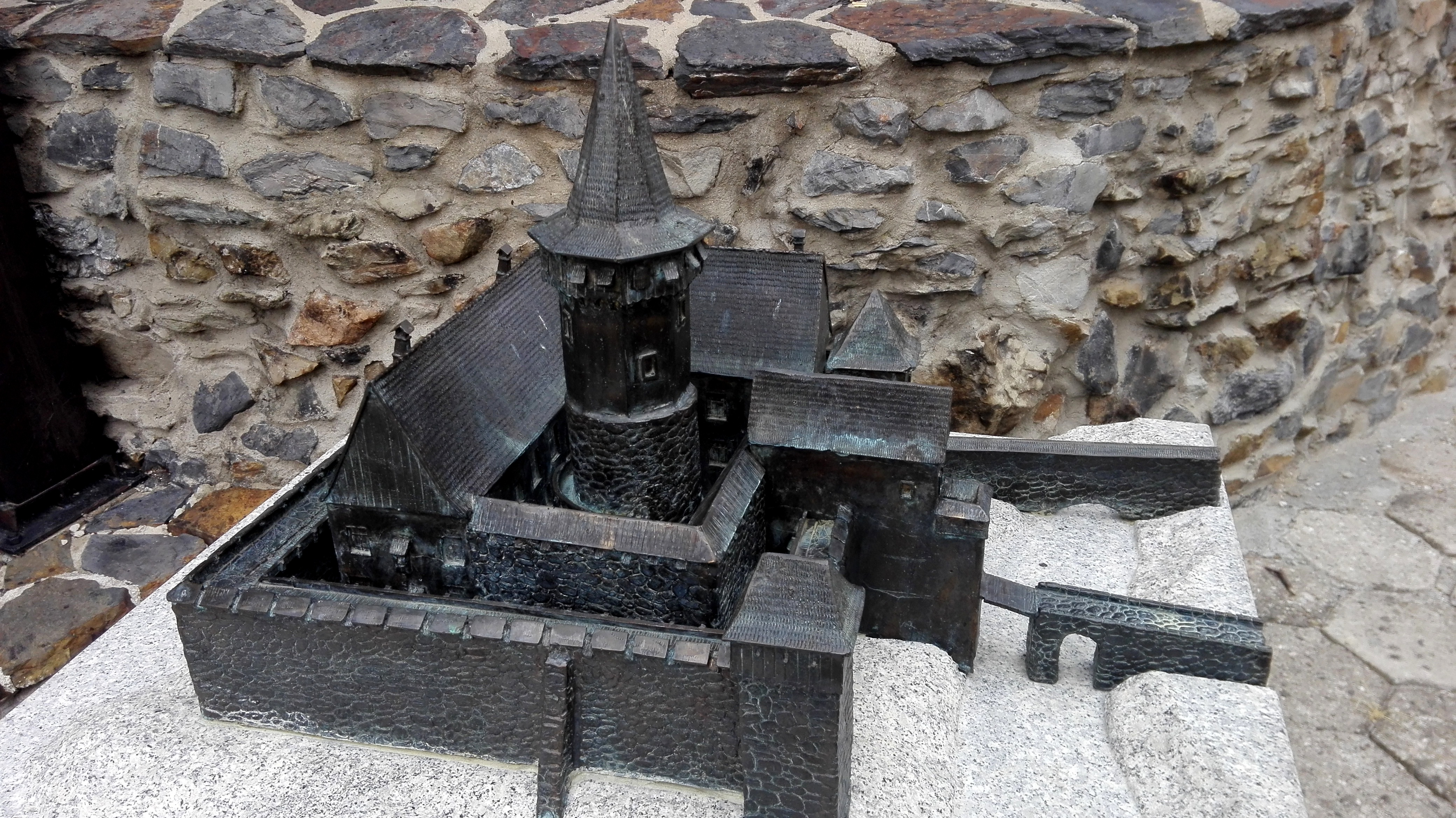
Prudnik Castle

During the reign of Duchess Euphemia, when the Duchy of Głogówek was extracted from the Duchy of Opole in 1401, its territory was limited to the contemporary Głogówek district. During Bolko V's reign, the districts of Prudnik and Biała were incorporated into the duchy. The Duke also annexed territories he conquered into the duchy. Following his death, they were returned to their rightful owners.

The duchy's capital was the town of Głogówek. The other towns in its borders were: Prudnik, Strzeleczki, Biała, and Kazimierz. Towns temporarily incorporated into the duchy by Bolko V were, among others, Głuchołazy and Koźle. On the duchy's territory were the castles of Prudnik, Głogówek, Biała, Piorunkowice, Chrzelice, Łąka Prudnicka.

=== Subdivisions ===
Borders of the districts that made the Duchy of Głogówek and Prudnik were described by Maciej Woźny in the "Ziemia Prudnicka" magazine (2008) and in the book Rycerstwo opolskie do połowy XV wieku (2020).

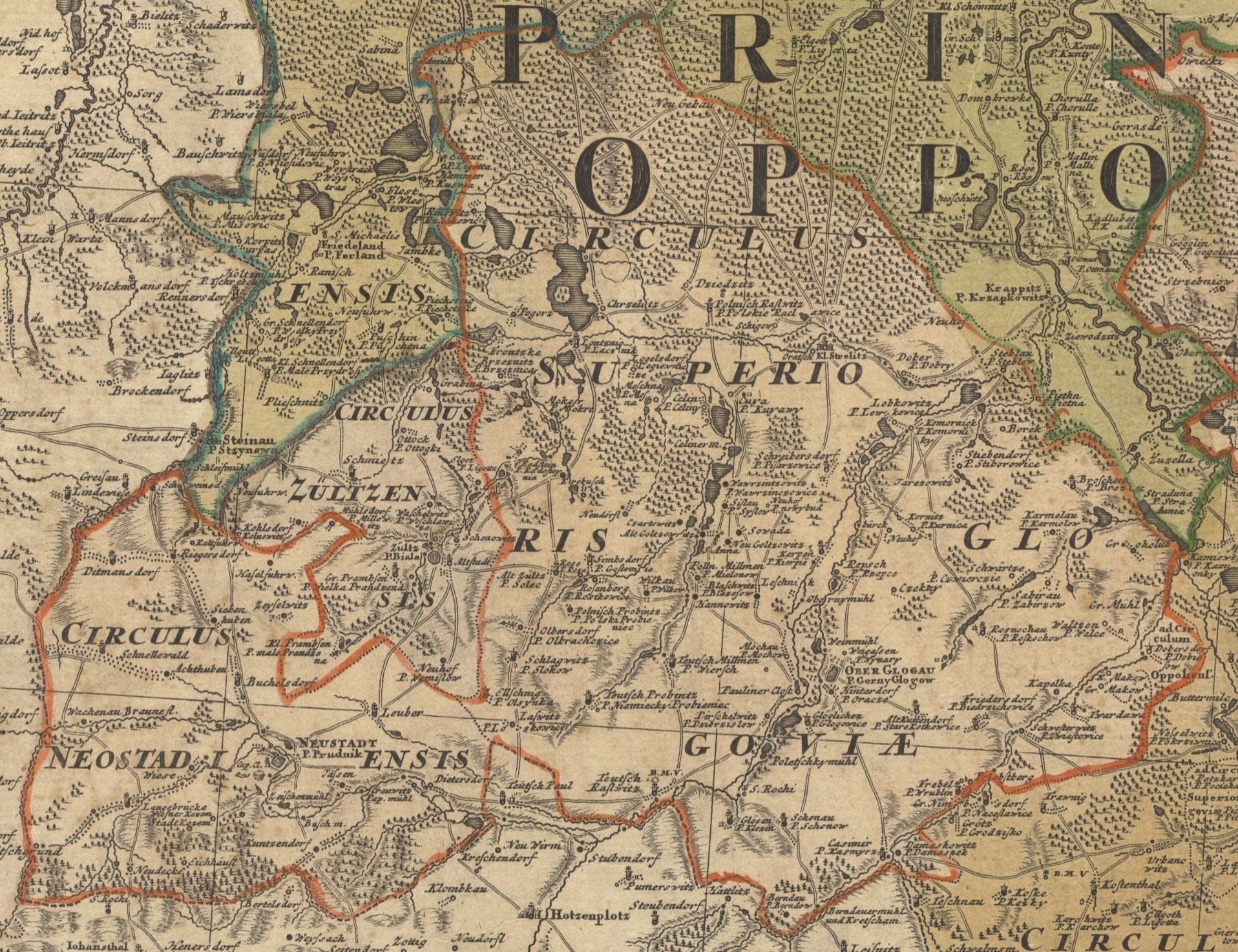
18th-century map of the districts that formed the duchy

The Biała district bordered the Głogówek district from the east. On Głogówek's side were Ligota Bialska and Solec, and on the Biała side were Wasiłowice, Biała, Prężyna, and Prężynka. South of Prężynka was the border with the Prudnik district. On Prudnik's side were Rudziczka, Czyżowice, and Lubrza. The river Ścinawa Niemodlińska separated the Biała district from the territory of the Bishop of Wrocław. The border with the Niemodlin district ran between Śmicz (in Biała) and Pleśnica (in Niemodlin).

The border between Głogówek and Niemodlin districts, established in 1383, ran from the village of Domecko (in Niemodlin) along the road to Lewin Brzeski. Other frontier villages were: Pogórze, Łąka, Brzeźnica, Ligota, Piechocice, Ostra Górka (modern Górka Prudnicka), and Czanstkowice. In the beginning of the 15th century, a part of the Głogówek district's territory to the north of Racławiczki and Strzeleczki was incorporated into the Opole district. The border with the Koźle district ran along the Stradunia river, with deviations in favor of the Głogówek district. On Głogówek's side were Damasko, Zwiastowice, Twardawa, Malkowice, and Dobieszowice. On Koźle's side were Ciesznów, Naczęsławice, and Grodzisko. The Głogówek district owned an enclave with the villages of Pociękarb, Bytków, Łężce, and Borzysławice. Another enclave of Głogówek was Chechło, surrounded by the Strzelce district. Southern border of the Głogówek district ran to the south of Biernatów and Kazimierz.

The district of Prudnik bordered the Głogówek district to the north. They were divided by a line to the south of Laskowice and Olszynka. The border ran to the south, dividing Prudnik from the Osoblaha district. The frontier villages on Prudnik's side were Krzyżkowice, Dytmarów, Trzebina, and Dębowiec. To the west, the Prudnik district bordered the Głuchołazy district. There, on Prudnik's side were Moszczanka, Włóczno, Szybowice, and Mieszkowice. North of Rudziczka, Czyżowice, and Lubrza, was the border with the Biała district.

== Dukes of Głogówek and Prudnik ==
- 1401–1418 — Euphemia of Masovia
- 1418–1427 — Bolko IV of Opole and Bernard of Niemodlin
- 1427–1460 — Bolko V the Hussite
- 1460–1476 — Nicholas I of Opole
- 1476–1497 — Nicholas II of Niemodlin
- 1497–1532 — Jan II the Good

== Bibliography ==
- Dziewulski, Władysław (1973). "Terytorialne podziały Opolszczyzny w XIII-XV w." (PDF). Śląski Kwartalnik Historyczny Sobótka. 3. Archived from the original (PDF) on 2019-09-21.
- Gosciniak, Alexander (2015). Wojny na Terytorium Śląska.
- Kasza, Ryszard (2020). Ulicami Prudnika z historią i fotografią w tle. Prudnik: Powiat Prudnicki. ISBN 978-83-954314-5-6.
- Książek, Krystian (2010). "Monety z dawnego cmentarza przy kościele Salwatora we Wrocławiu: opóźniona depozycja monet w darach grobowych" (PDF). Wiadomości Numizmatyczne. 1 (189). Komitet Nauk Historycznych PAN. ISSN 0043-5155.
- Lesiuk, Wiesław (1978). Ziemia Prudnicka. Dzieje, gospodarka, kultura. Urząd Miasta i Gminy w Prudniku, Wydawnictwo Instytutu Śląskiego w Opolu. OCLC 251643861.
- Sękowski, Roman (2011). Koniec średniowiecza i kształtowanie się podstaw ustrojowych księstw opolskiego i raciborskiego (szkice i wypisy źródłowe). Opole: Wydawnictwo Piotr Kalinowski. ISBN 978-83-62995-27-1.
- Woźny, Maciej (2020). Rycerstwo opolskie do połowy XV wieku. Katowice: Wydawnictwo Uniwersytetu Śląskiego. ISBN 978-83-226-3887-3.
