= Biedrzychowice, Opole Voivodeship =

Biedrzychowice Friedersdorf
- Village
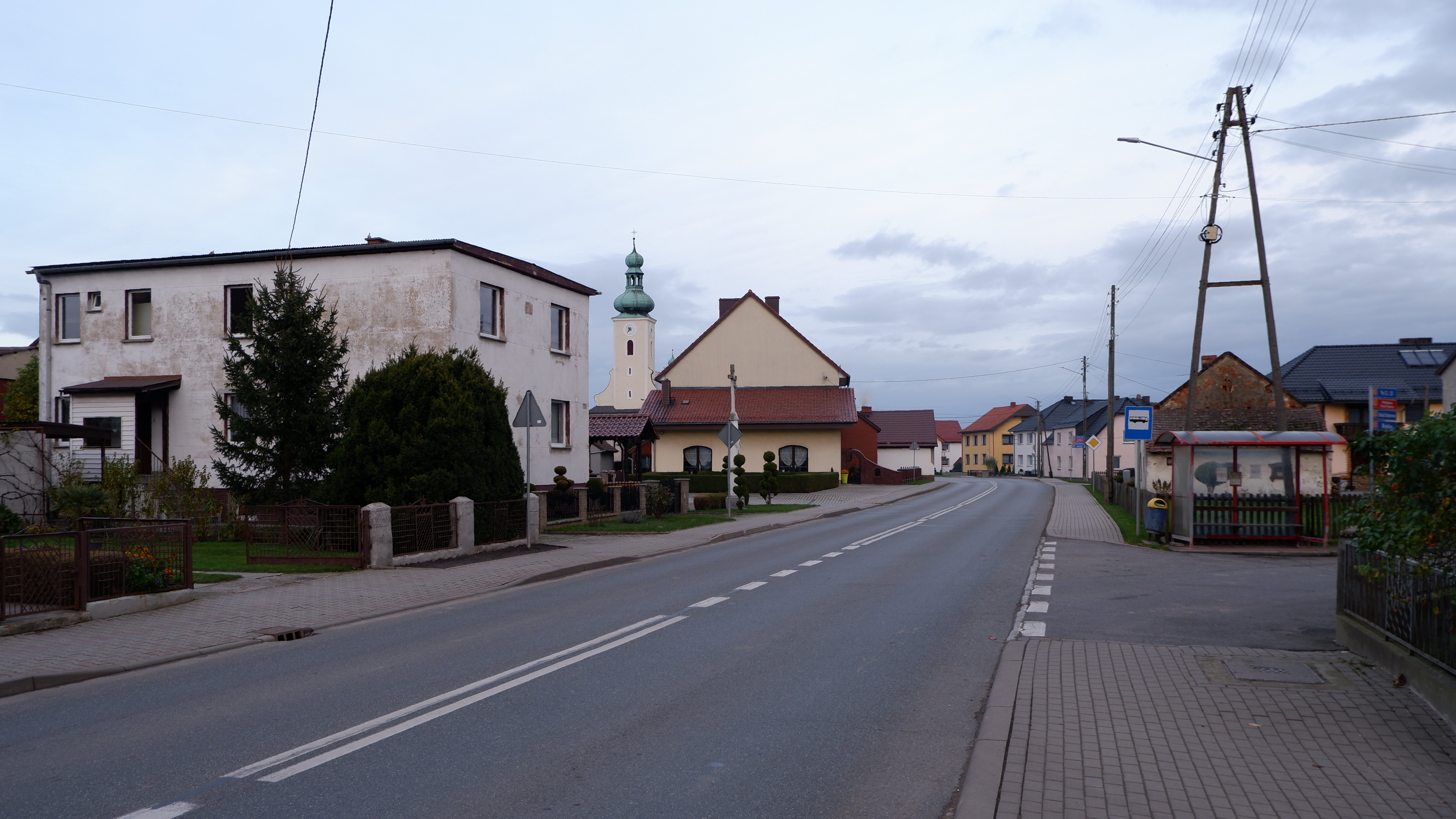
- Centre of the village

- Location within Poland
- Coordinates: 50°20′12″N 17°56′22″E
- Country: Poland
- Voivodeship: Opole
- County: Prudnik
- Gmina: Głogówek
- First mentioned: 1228

Population (2021)
  - Total: 714
- Time zone: UTC+1 (CET)
  - Summer (DST): UTC+2
- Postal code: 48-250
- Area code: +4877
- Vehicle registration: OPR

Biedrzychowice ([bjɛdʐɨxɔˈvit͡sɛ], additional name in German: Friedersdorf) is a village in the administrative district of Gmina Głogówek, within Prudnik County, Opole Voivodeship, southern Poland. It is situated in the historical region of Prudnik Land in Upper Silesia.

As of 31 December 2021, the village's population numbered 714 inhabitants. A significant portion of them belongs to the German minority in Poland.

== Geography ==
The village is located in the southern part of Opole Voivodeship, close to the Czech Republic–Poland border. It is situated in the historical Prudnik Land region, as well as in Upper Silesia. It lies in the Silesian Lowlands, in the valley of Stradunia river. The sołectwo of Biedrzychowice has an area of 763 hectares (1,890 acres).

=== Integral parts ===
According to the National Register of Geographical Names for 2025, the village of Biedrzychowice had 2 integral parts, divided into:

- 1 part of the village (część wsi): Kapełków
- 1 former village (uroczysko-dawna miejscowość): Szelonka

== Etymology ==
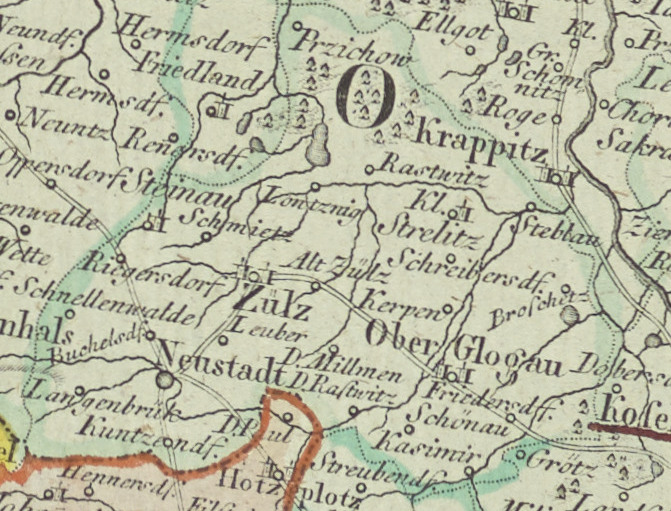
Friedersdorf among other localities of Prudnik Land on an 1804 map

The name Biedrzychowice was derived from the name Biedrzych. It was first recorded in 1228 as Bedrchouici. The name was adopted into the German language as Friedersdorf.

Following the Second World War, the historic Polish name Biedrzychowice was confirmed official by the Commission for the Determination of Place Names on 16 December 1946. As Gmina Głogówek gained the bilingual status on 1 December 2009, the government introduced an additional German name for the village: Friedersdorf.

== History ==
Traces of human presence in the area of the present-day village of Biedrzychowice, confirmed by archaeological research, date back to the 18th and 17th centuries BC. There is a Neolithic archaeological site on the village's territory. There are also traces of Celtic presence.

The village's name was first recorded in a Latin document published in 1228 by duke Casimir I of Opole, in which Biedrzychowice was listed among villages of the Duchy of Opole and Racibórz which were established with Polish law (iure polonico). The name of the person who established the village was presumably Bedrich or Friedrich. Casimir I passed Biedrzychowice on to the Norbertines of Czarnowąsy. The parish church in Biedrzychowice was first mentioned in a 1430 document by duke Bolko V the Hussite of Duchy of Głogówek and Prudnik. Until 1532 it was part of the Piast-ruled Duchy of Opole and Racibórz formed as a result of the medieval fragmentation of Poland into smaller duchies. Afterwards, it was integrated into the Bohemian Crown and Habsburg Empire, administratively becoming part of Głogówek County (circulus superioris Glogoviae) until 1742, and returning to Polish rule under the House of Vasa from 1645 to 1666. 17th-century documents of the Diocese of Wrocław mentioned a school in Biedrzychowice. After the First Silesian War, it was annexed by the Kingdom of Prussia was incorporated into Prudnik County (Großkreis Neustadt).

=== 20th century ===
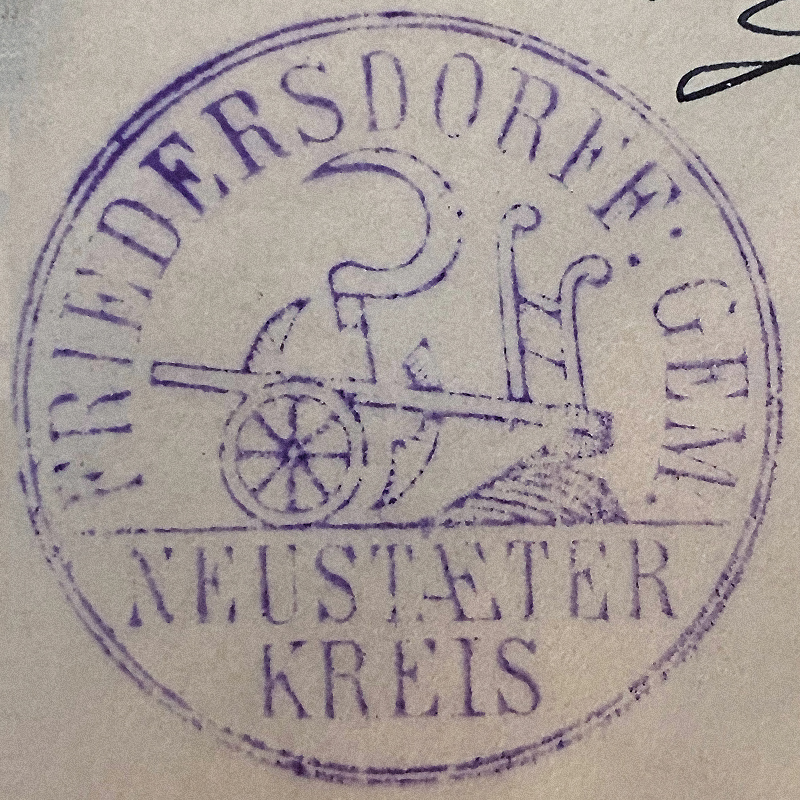
20th-century sigil

The village had its own sigil. According to the 1 December 1910 census, among 1490 inhabitants of Biedrzychowice, 1397 spoke Polish, 57 spoke German, and 36 were bilingual. After the First World War, a monument dedicated to people from Biedrzychowice who died in the war, was erected in the village. Only a portion of Prudnik County participated in the 1921 Upper Silesia plebiscite, which was supposed to determine ownership of the Province of Upper Silesia between Germany and Poland. Biedrzychowice found itself in the eastern part of the county, within the plebiscite area. 749 people of Biedrzychowice voted to remain in Germany, and 85 voted to reunite with Poland. In the end Biedrzychowice remained in Germany. The Wawelberg Group destroyed a railway bridge near Biedrzychowice as a part of Operation "Bridges", which started the Third Silesian Uprising on 2 May 1921.

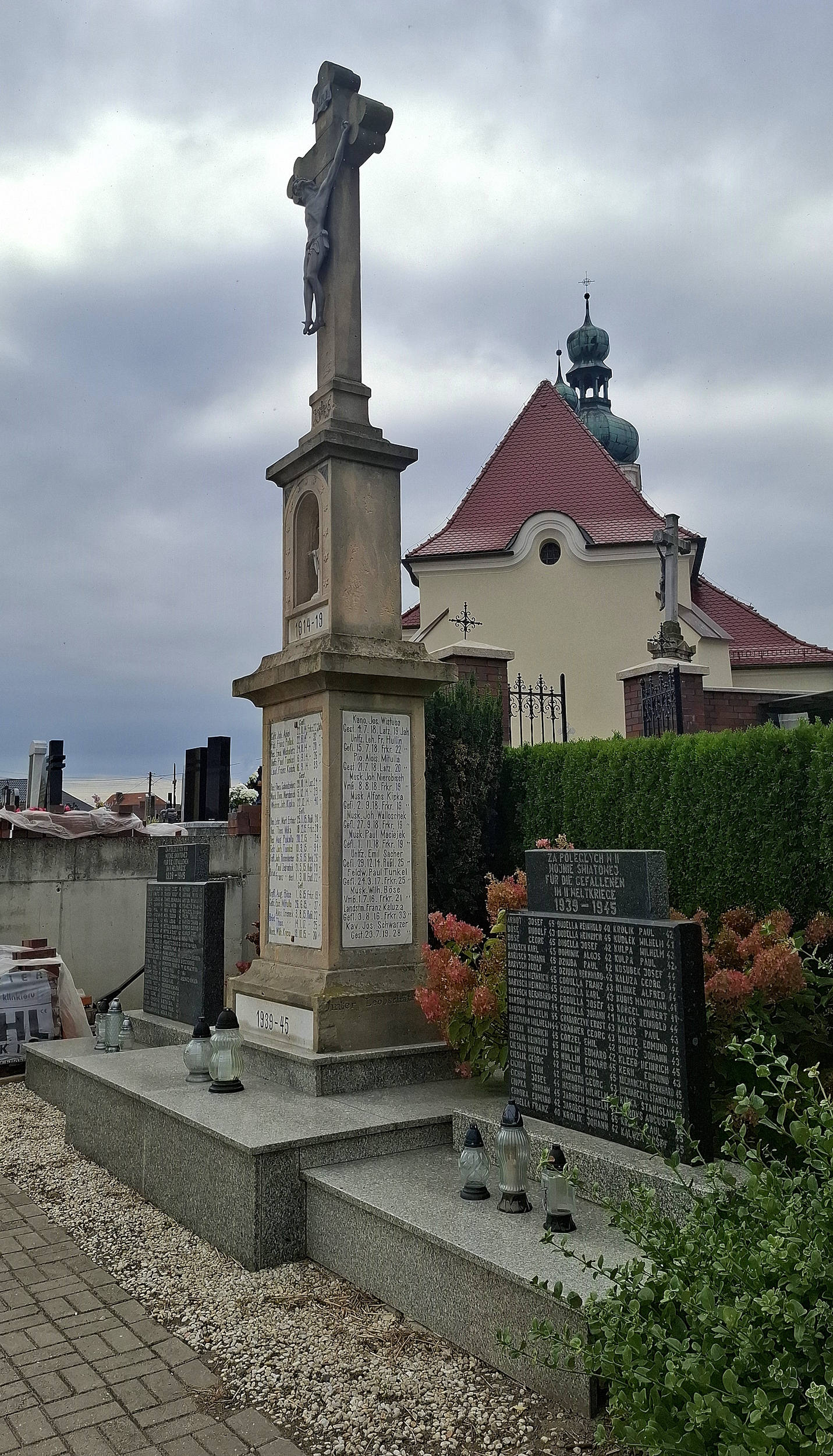
World War I and II memorial

Following the Second World War, from March to May 1945, Prudnik County was controlled by the Soviet military commandant's office. On 11 May 1945, it was passed on to the Polish administration. Autochthonous inhabitants of Biedrzychowice, who either knew Polish or spoke Silesian, were allowed to remain in the village. On 9 September 1945, Soviet soldiers shot two people in Biedrzychowice. When three members of the Polish Citizens' Militia arrived, they were fired upon by the Soviets. One Polish militiaman was wounded and then executed. Soviet reinforcements came, hunted down the fleeing post commander, beat him, and tried to seize the post's weapons. The violence lasted until next morning, when a joint Polish-Soviet commission arrived to investigate the incident.

The village became a part of Silesian Voivodeship in 1945. It belongs to Opole Voivodeship since 1950. In the years 1945–1954, the village was the seat of Gmina Biedrzychowice in Prudnik County. From 1954 until 1973, it was the seat of a local gromada (the lowest tier of local government). It belonged to the post office in Głogówek. In 1998, Biedrzychowice joined the Opole Village Renewal Program.

== Demographics ==
Biedrzychowice is inhabited by autochthonous Silesians and Germans, belonging to the registered German minority in Poland. The residents speak the Prudnik dialect of the Silesian language. The village gained the bilingual Polish-German status in 2009.

== Transport ==
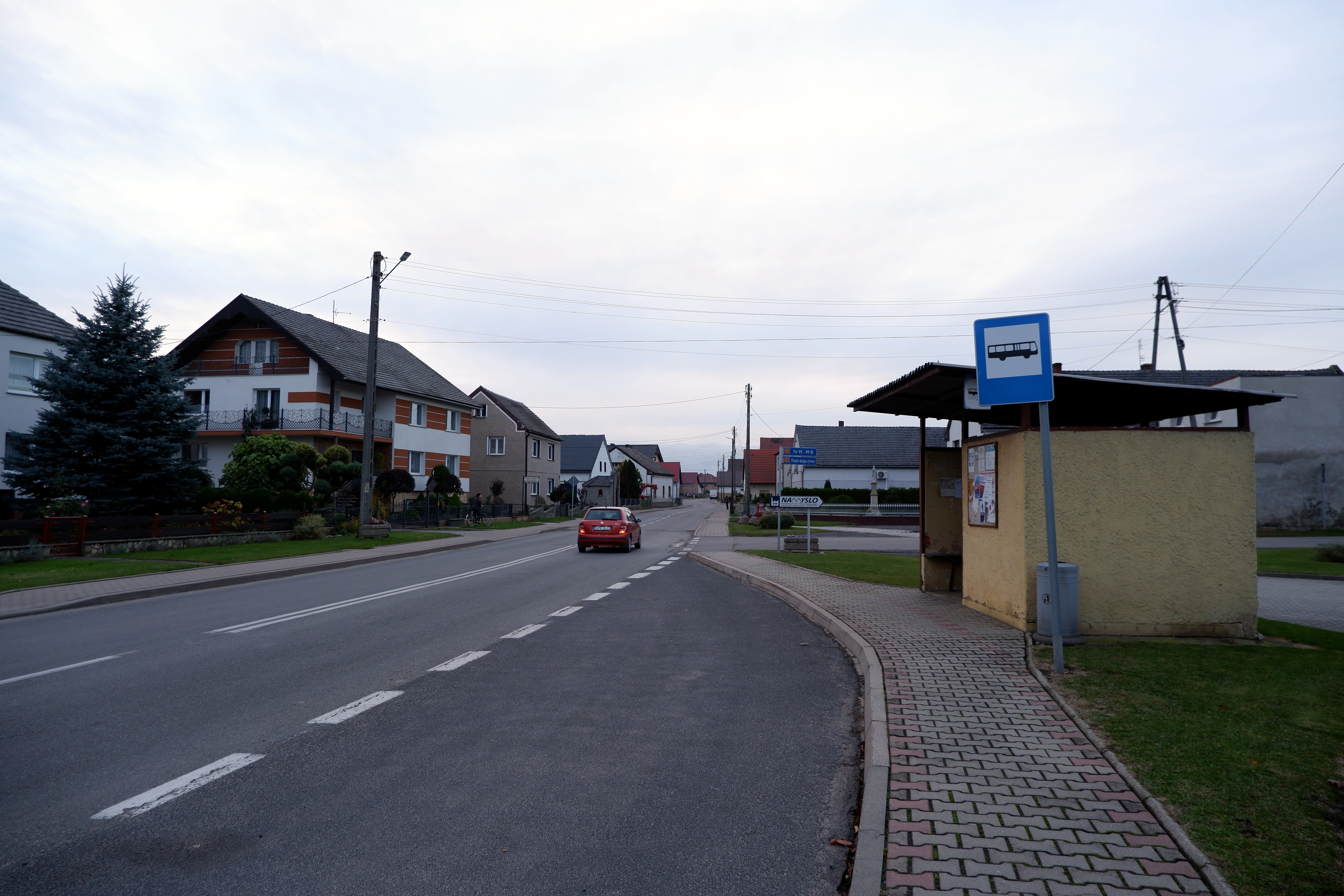
Bus stop

The Katowice–Legnica railway (rail line number 137), which connects Upper and Lower Silesia regions, runs in the vicinity of Biedrzychowice. The closest railway stations are located in Głogówek and Twardawa. National road 40 runs through the village. The local public transport buses were operated by PKS Prudnik. Since 2021, public transit is organized by the PGZT "Pogranicze" corporation in Prudnik.

== Institutions ==
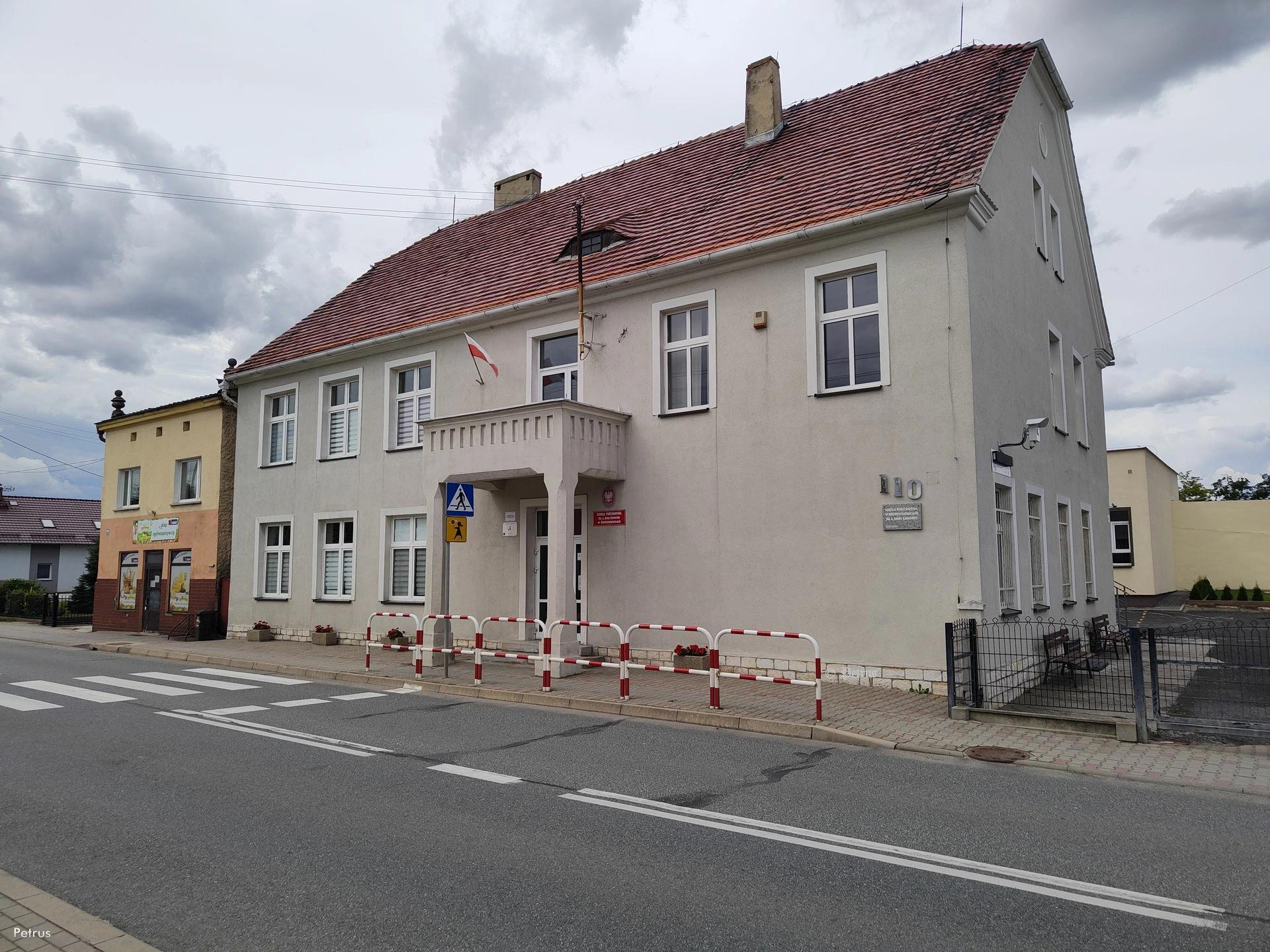
Primary school

Institutions located in Biedrzychowice include:

- "Farska Stodoła" museum
- primary school named after Anna Kaworek
- preschool
- German Friendship Circle (Deutscher Freundeskreis), a subsidiary of the Social-Cultural Society of Germans in Opole Silesia
- women's football club Rolnik Biedrzychowice
- health clinic
- Voluntary Fire Brigade (OSP)

== Religion ==
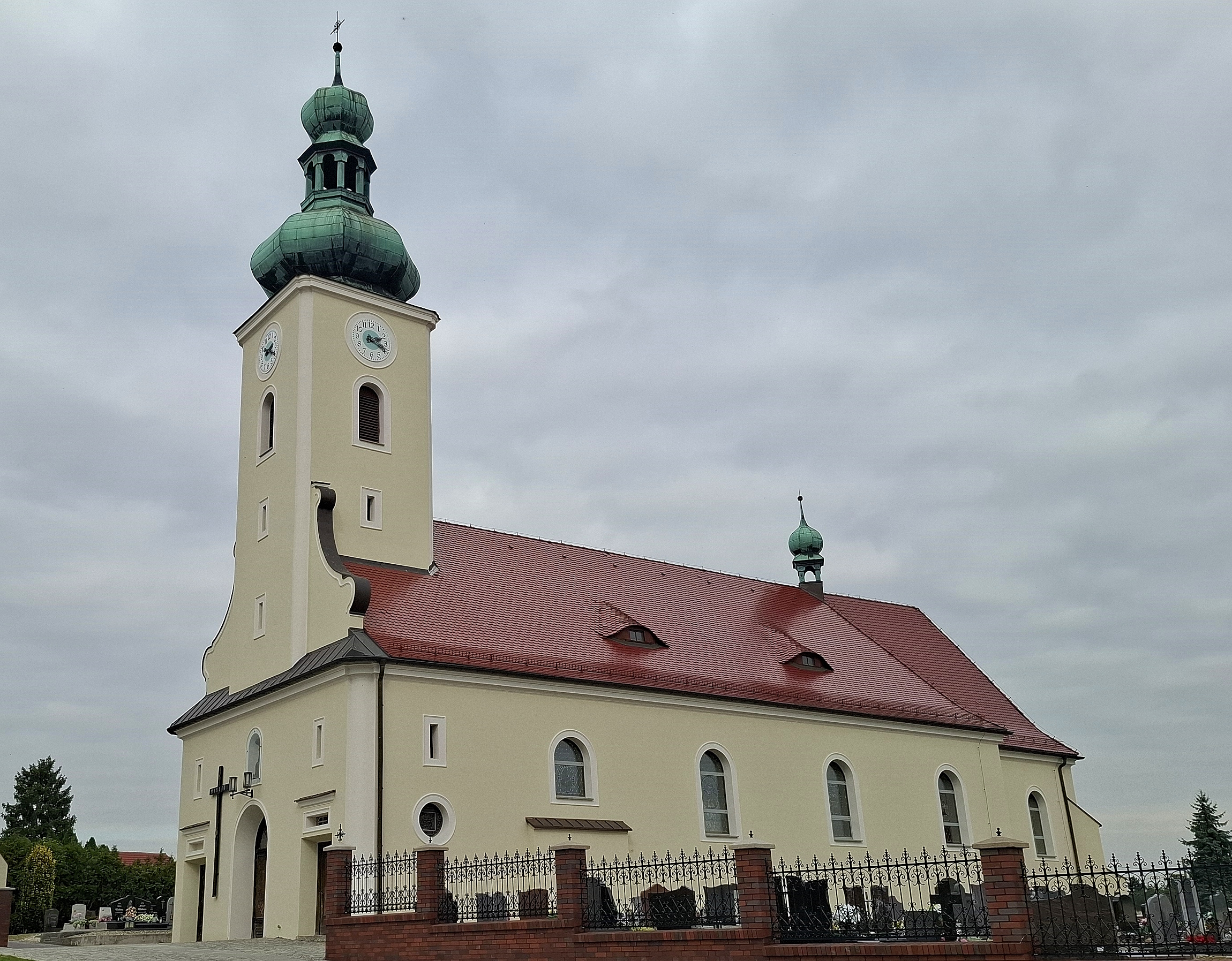
Church of the Assumption

The Roman Catholic Church of the Assumption is located in the village. The church is a seat of the local parish, which belongs to the Diocese of Opole.

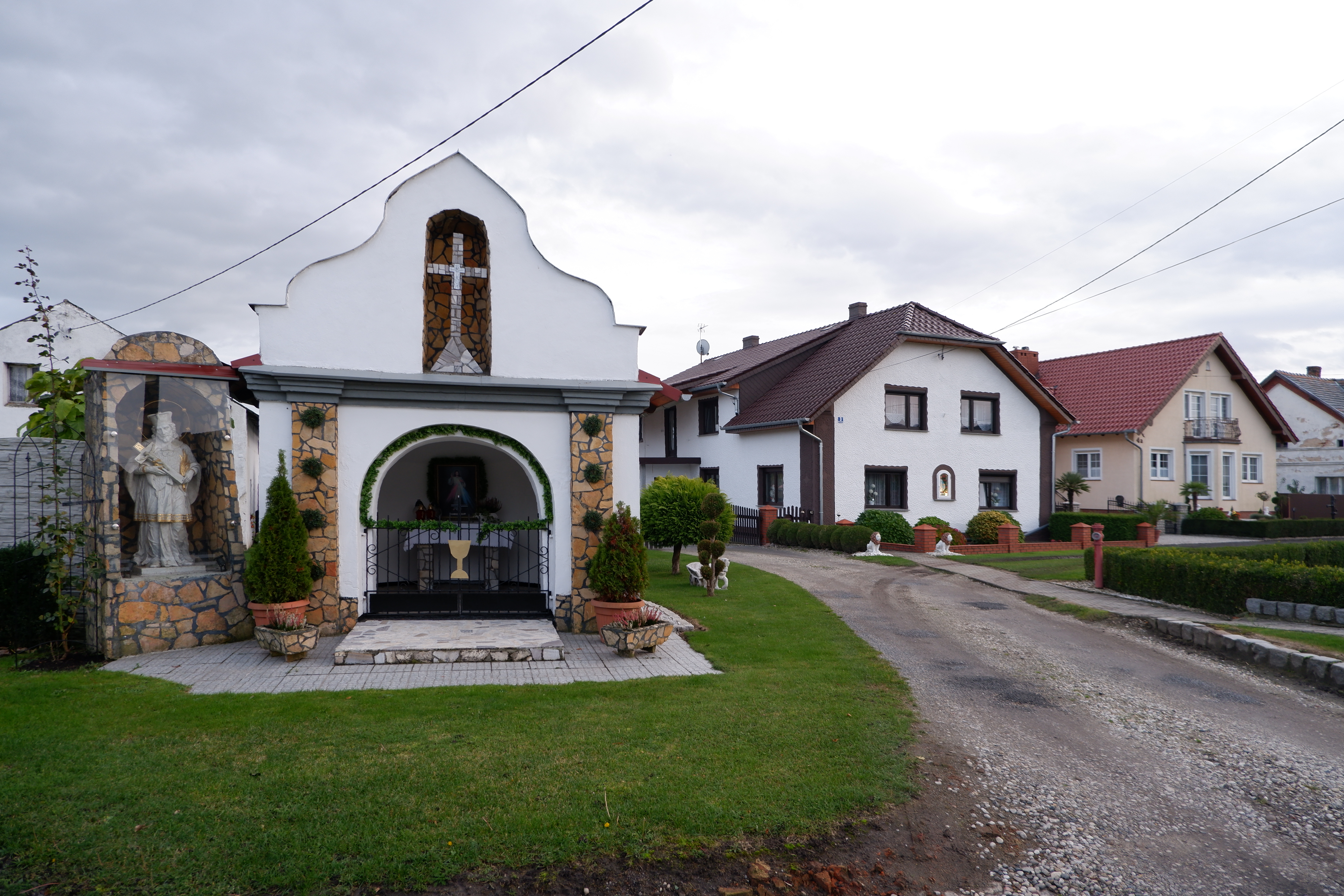
Wayside shrine

== Bibliography ==
- "Plan Odnowy Miejscowości Biedrzychowice na lata 2018–2023" (PDF). bip.glogowek.pl (in Polish). 2018.
