= Strzeleczki =

Strzeleczki Klein Strehlitz
- Town
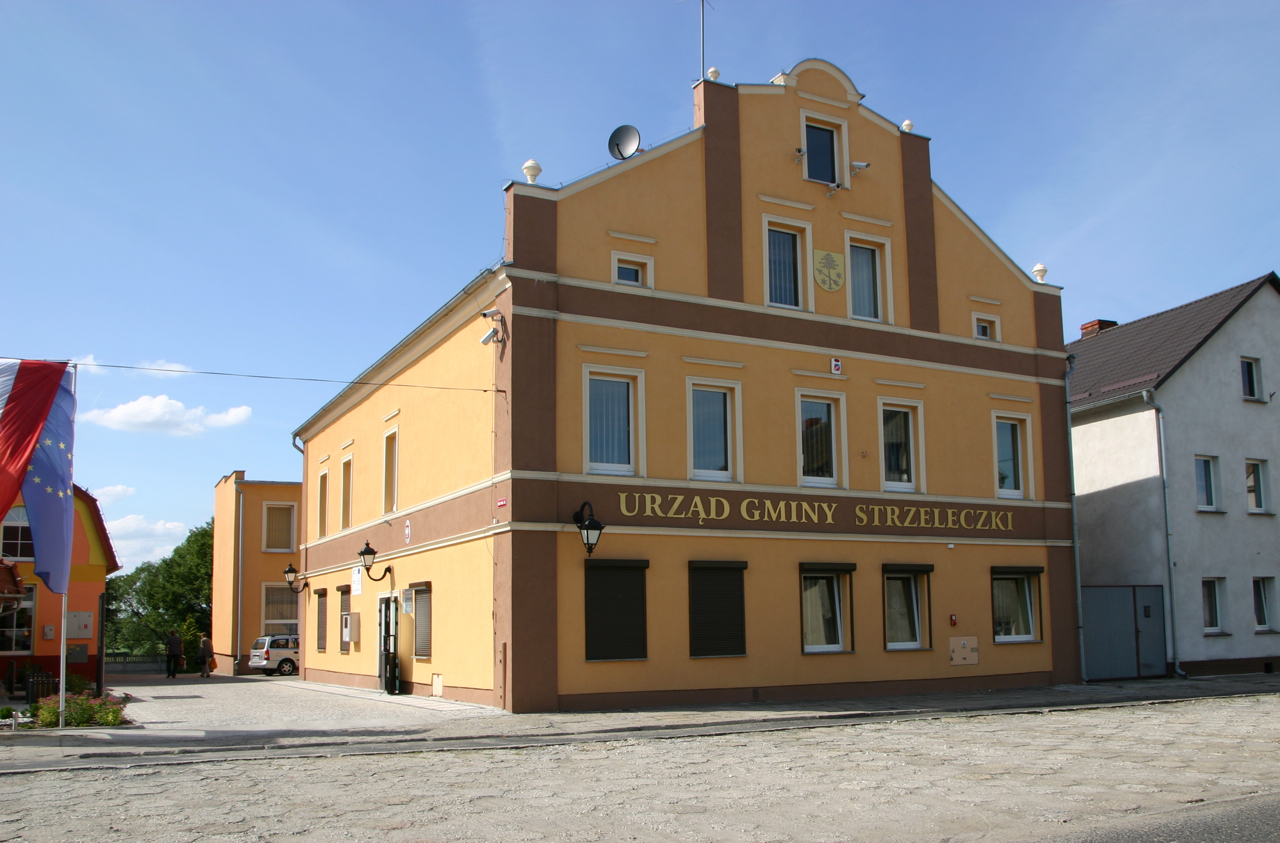
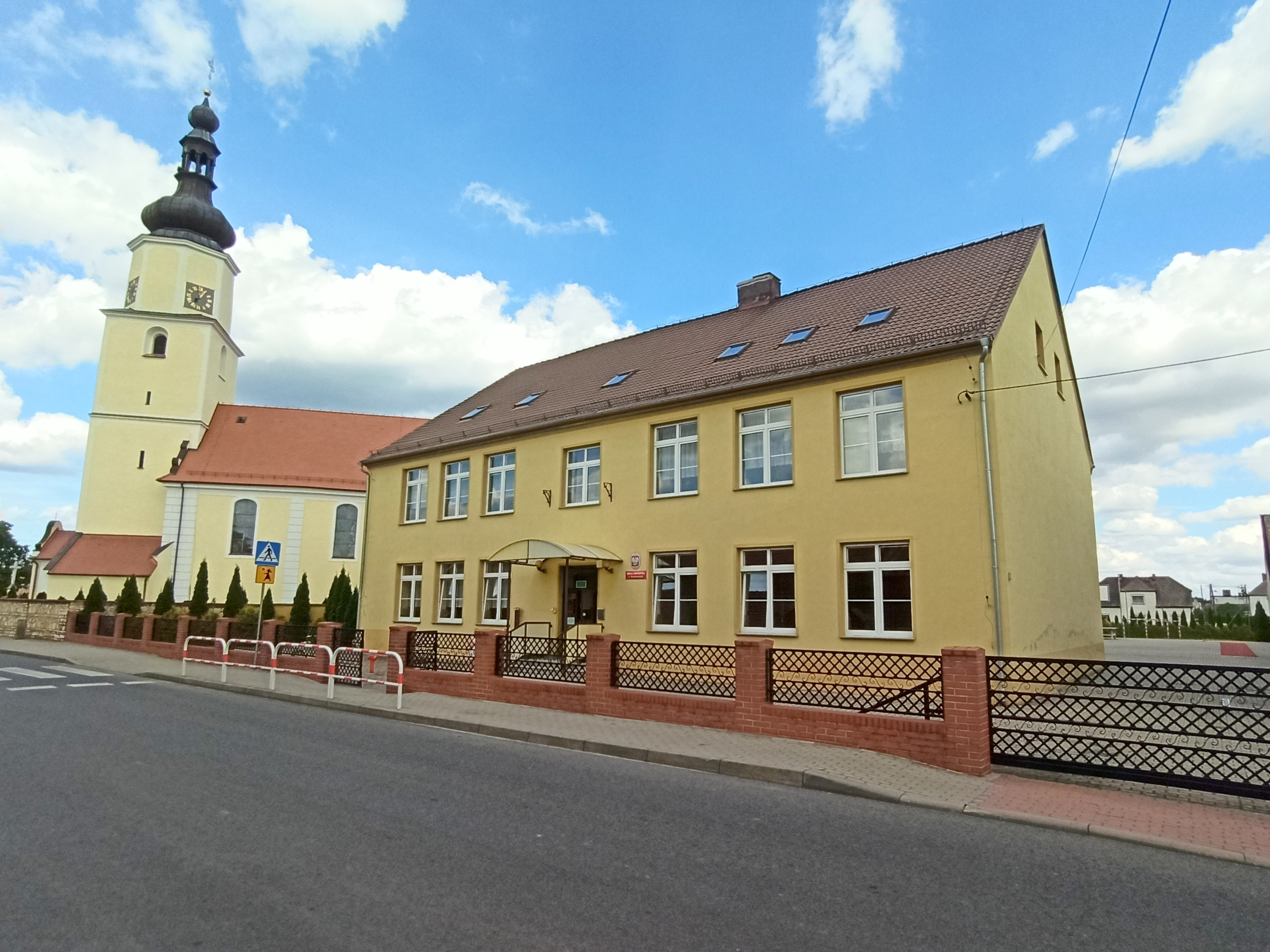
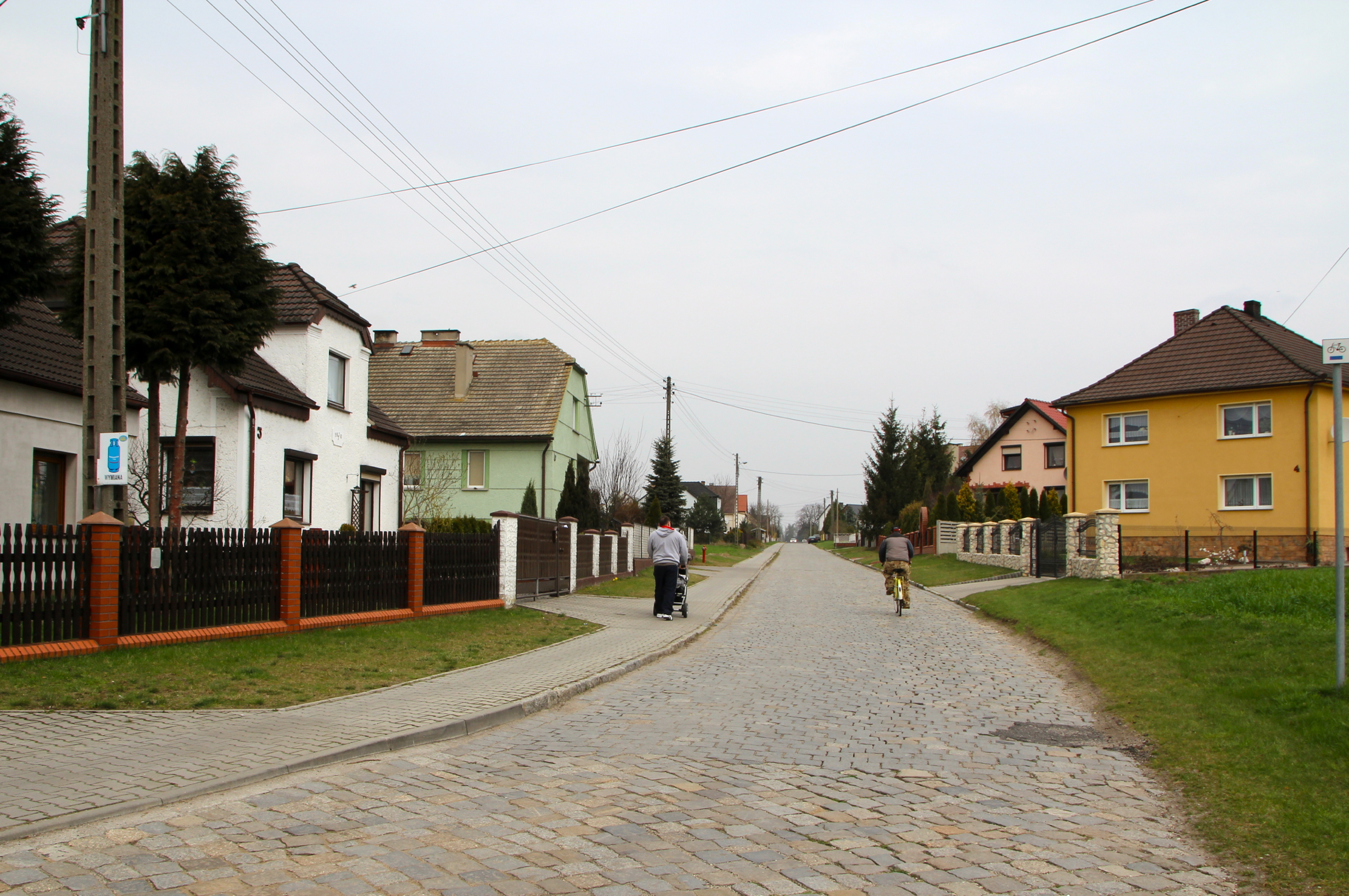
- Town Hall Saint Martin church and primary school Zbychowice district

- Flag Coat of arms

- Location within Poland
- Coordinates: 50°28′N 17°52′E
- Country: Poland
- Voivodeship: Opole
- County: Krapkowice
- Gmina: Strzeleczki
- Established: 13th century
- First mentioned: 1327

Government
  - Body: Strzeleczki Town Council
  - Mayor: Marek Pietruszka (Ind.)

Area
  - Total: 27.74 km^{2} (10.71 sq mi)

Population (2021)
  - Total: 1,539
  - Density: 54/km^{2} (140/sq mi)
- Demonym(s): strzeleczkanin (male) strzeleczkanka (female) (pl)
- Time zone: UTC+1 (CET)
  - Summer (DST): UTC+2 (CEST)
- Postal code: 47-364
- Area code: +4877
- Vehicle registration: OKR
- Website: www.strzeleczki.pl

Strzeleczki [stʂɛˈlɛt͡ʂki] (additional name in German: Klein Strehlitz) is a town in the administrative district of Krapkowice County, within Opole Voivodeship, southern Poland. It is the administrative seat of Gmina Strzeleczki. It is situated in the historical region of Prudnik Land.

As of 31 December 2021, the town's population numbered 1,539 inhabitants. A significant portion of them belongs to the German minority in Poland.

== Geography ==
The town is located in the southern part of Opole Voivodeship, close to the Czech Republic–Poland border. It is situated in the historical Prudnik Land region, as well as in Upper Silesia. It lies in the Silesian Lowlands, in the valley of Biała river. The town of Strzeleczki has an area of 2,775 hectares (6,860 acres).

=== Integral parts ===
According to the National Register of Geographical Names for 2025, the town of Strzeleczki had 1 integral part, classified as a part of the town (część miasta): Zbychowice.

== Etymology ==
The town's name, first recorded as Strelicz, is derived from an Old Polish word strzelec, which means "archer" or "hunter". In 1531, the town's name was recorded in a Latin form as Parva Streletz, and in 1535 as Klein Streletz in German. This was to distinguish it from the nearby town of (Groß) Strehlitz (Strzelce Opolskie). Since the 18th century, as the town became a part of Prussia, which it was officially known under the Germanized name Klein Strehlitz. In Polish it was historically known as Strzelce Małe and Strzeleczki.

Following the Second World War, the historic Polish name Strzeleczki was introduced by the Commission for the Determination of Place Names on 12 November 1946. As Gmina Strzeleczki gained the bilingual status on 24 November 2008, the government introduced an additional German name for the town: Klein Strehlitz.

== History ==
=== Middle Ages ===
The market settlement of Strzeleczki was founded in the early 13th century, when it was part of fragmented Piast-ruled Poland. It was established presumably during duke Vladislaus I reign in the Duchy of Opole and Racibórz. Archaeological researchers found remainings of a medieval hillfort in the territory of present-day Strzeleczki, as well as pieces of 13th-century clay vessels.

Strzeleczki was first recorded as a town and Catholic parish in a 1327 document. The town, owned by the duke, was not surrounded by defense walls. Its inhabitants worked as farmers and craftsmen. A school in Strzeleczki was established in 1375, as one of the first schools in Upper Silesia. The town was a part of the Duchy of Niemodlin. Next, it was located in the Duchy of Głogówek and Prudnik. In 1427, Bolko V the Hussite, duke of Głogówek and Prudnik, confirmed the earlier privilege allowing Jews to settle in Prudnik, Biała, Głogówek, and Strzeleczki. On 13 March 1428, the town was looted and burned by the Hussites, and its residents were taken prisoners.

=== 16th–20th century ===
In 1524, the town rights given to Strzeleczki were reaffirmed. It remained the duke's possession until 1532. The first mention of the local town council was recorded in 1564. In the 16th century, Strzeleczki, as a part of the Chrzelice castle estate, was purchased by the Prószkowski family, The next owners of the Chrzelice estate were the Dietrichsteins.

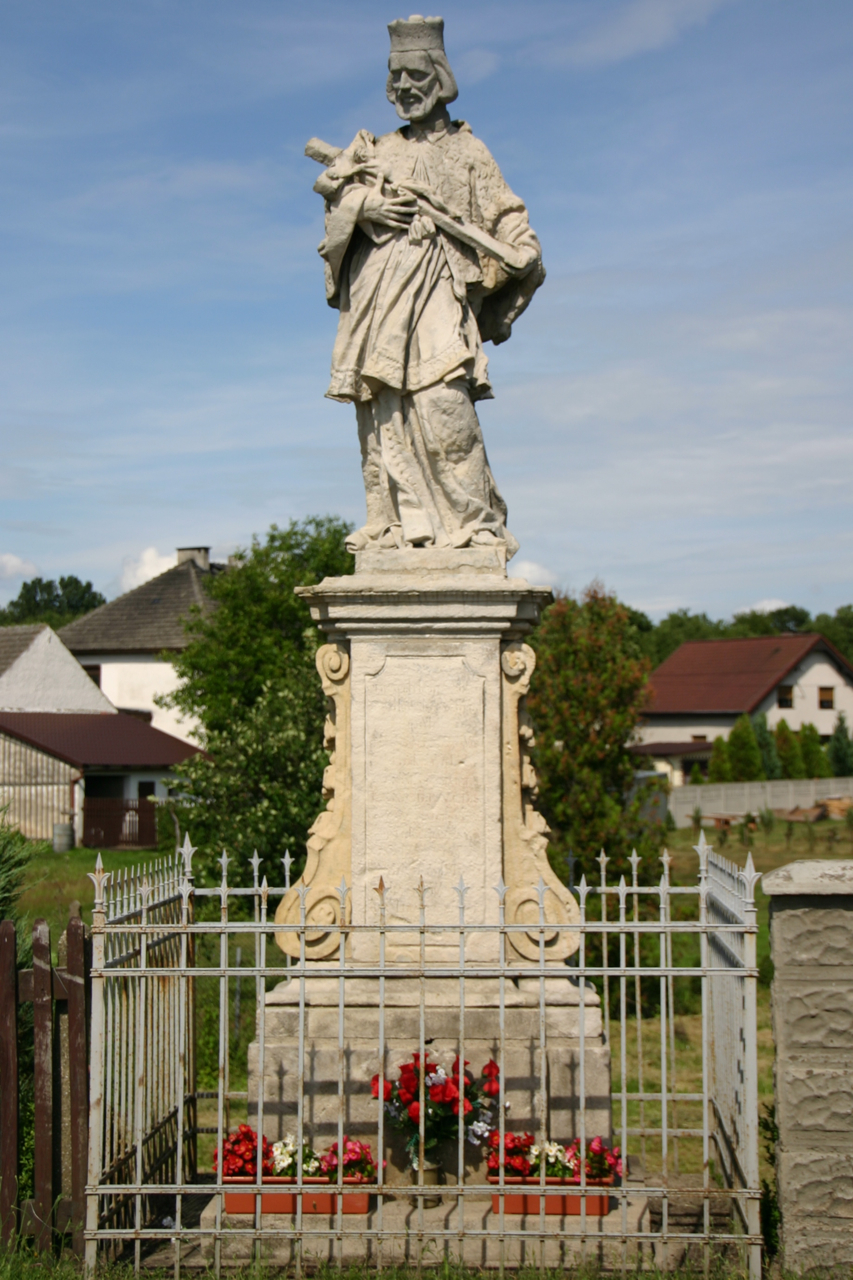
Baroque statue of Saint John of Nepomuk

In the years 1618–1626, the town was inhabited by 500–600 people. It was destroyed again, this time by Swedish forces, during the Thirty Years' War in 1642. Strzeleczki and Ścinawa Mała were the two most heavily destroyed towns of Prudnik Land. The first mention of a mayor of Strzeleczki was recorded in 1656. In the 17th and early 18th centuries, guilds of potters, bakers, tailors, and blacksmiths operated in Strzeleczki.

Until 1742, the town was a part of Głogówek County (circulus superioris Glogoviae) in the Habsburg Empire. After the First Silesian War, it was annexed by the Kingdom of Prussia was incorporated into Prudnik County (Großkreis Neustadt).

In that same year, Strzeleczki, along with Ścinawa Mała, were deprived of their town rights and became market settlements. They were considered to be "second-rank towns" of Prudnik County. The residents were still considered townsmen, but they did not pay town taxes. In 1783, Frederick the Great bought the Chrzelice castle and Strzeleczki.

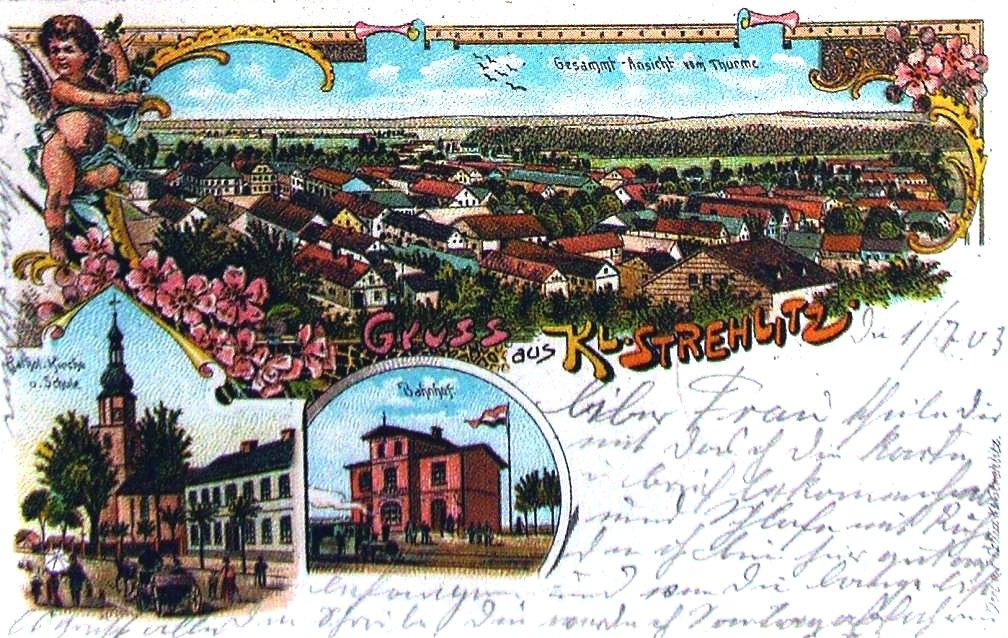
19th-century postcard

On 16 February 1813, a fire destroyed two-thirds of all buildings in Strzeleczki, along with the church and school. Since 21 until 28 January and since 4 until 18 February 1832, there was a cholera epidemic in Strzeleczki. In 1861, 15 Jews lived in the settlement. In the mid-19th century, it housed a distillery and a royal forest department. In 1890, Strzeleczki had a population of 1,428, of whom 1,404 were Catholic, 17 Protestant, and 7 Jewish. On 1 April 1894, the village of Oracze and the colony of Zbychowice were incorporated into Strzeleczki, raising the number of its inhabitants to 2,036. In 1896, the Prudnik–Gogolin railway, running through Strzeleczki, started operating. According to the 1 December 1910 census, among 1,801 inhabitants of Strzeleczki, 162 spoke German, 1524 spoke Polish, and 115 were bilingual.

=== Interwar period ===
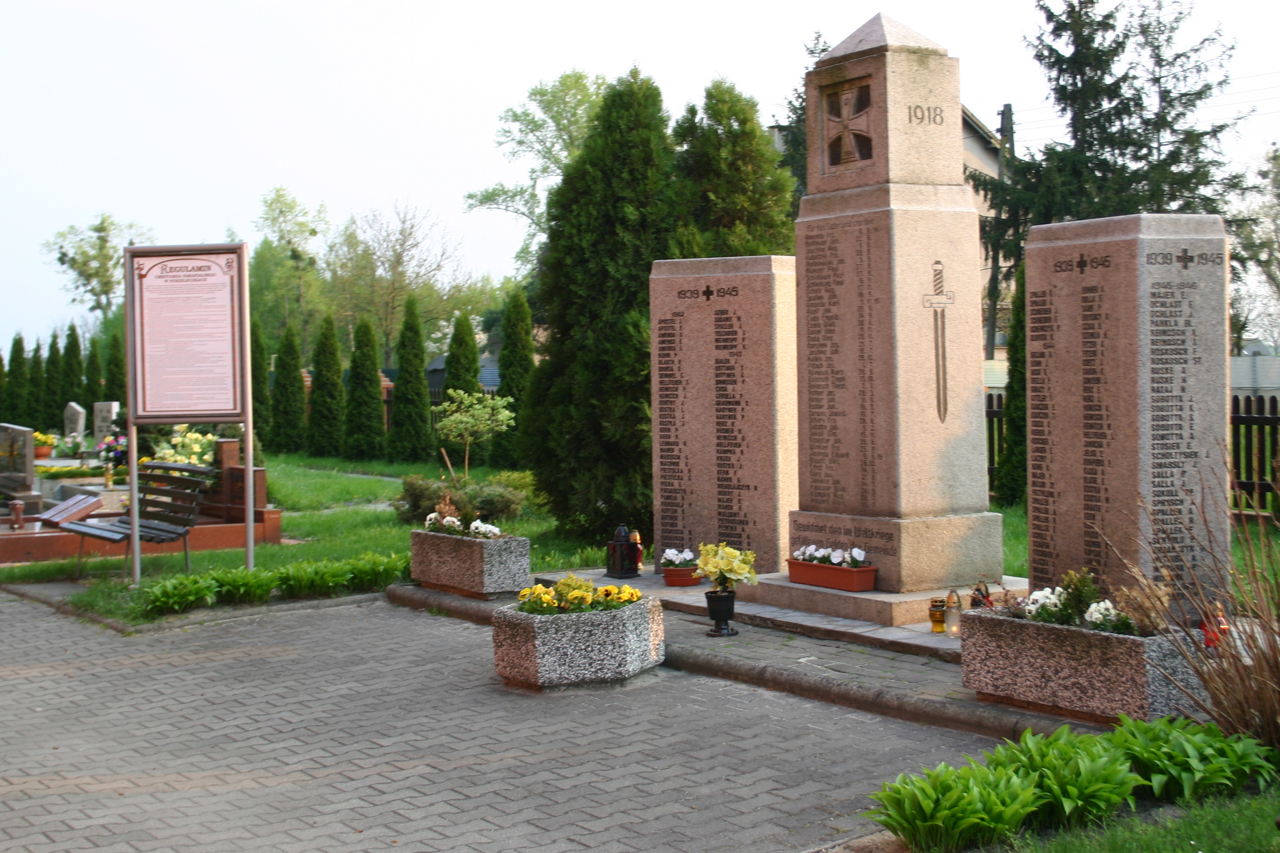
War monument

After the First World War, a monument dedicated to people from Strzeleczki who died in the war, was erected in the settlement. Several Polish organizations were established in Strzeleczki. It stopped being regarded as a market settlement in 1919, becoming a village instead. During the Second Silesian Uprising, Polish insurgents were transported to Strzeleczki via the Prudnik–Gogolin railway. Only a portion of Prudnik County participated in the 1921 Upper Silesia plebiscite, which was supposed to determine ownership of the Province of Upper Silesia between Germany and Poland. Strzeleczki found itself in the eastern part of the county, within the plebiscite area. The village was the seat of the Polish Plebiscite Committee for Prudnik County, after its premises in Prudnik were attacked. 1,381 people of Strzeleczki voted to remain in Germany, and 198 voted to secede for Poland. In the end, the area of Prudnik, along with Strzeleczki, remained in Germany.

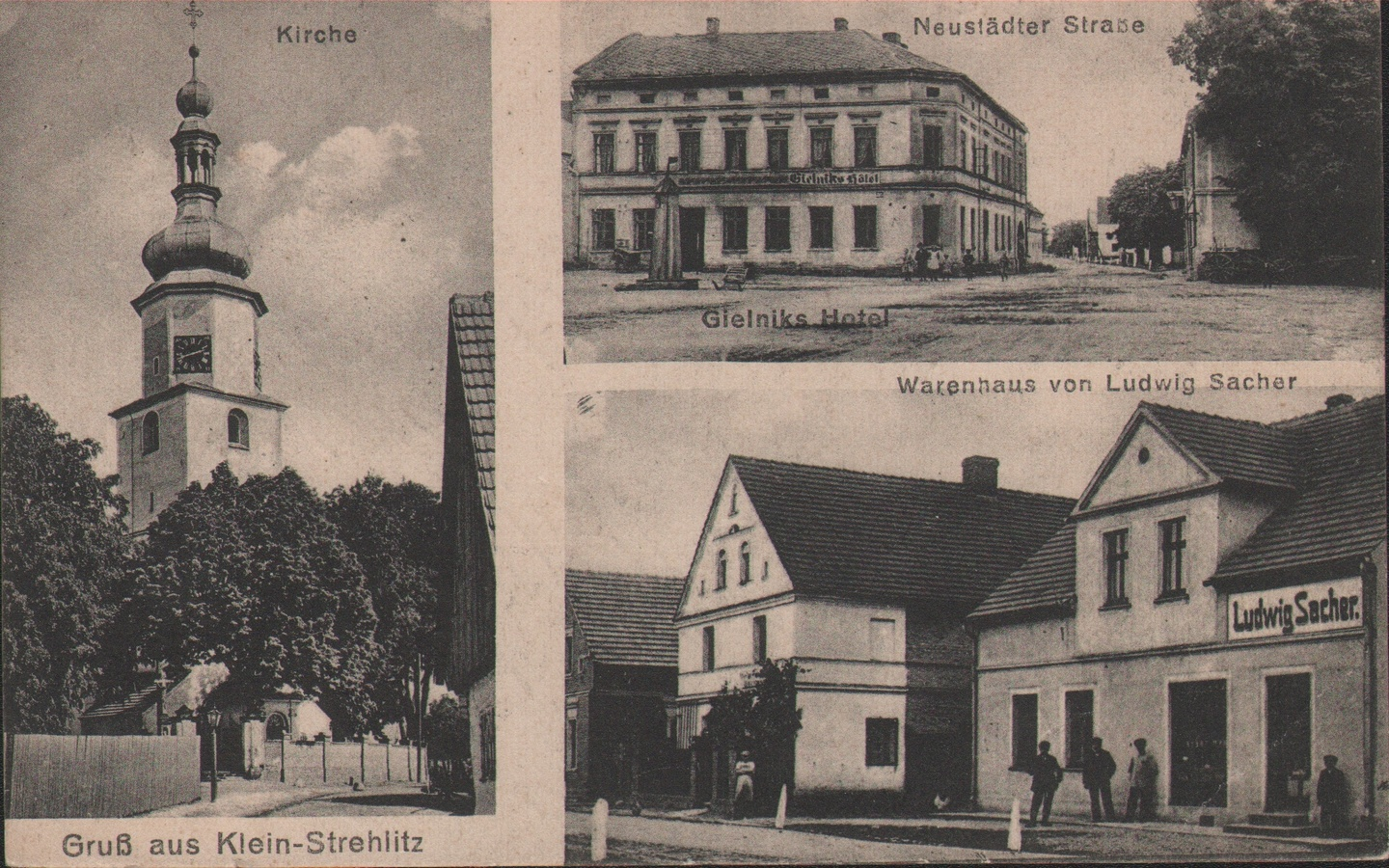
1920s postcard showing the Saint Martin church, the Market Square, and the Prudnicka Street

During the Third Silesian Uprising, the village became a centre of the Polish Military Organisation for Prudnik County, which recruited people for the insurgent units. Polish insurgents from Strzeleczki served in the 3rd Prudnik Company. A Polish library was founded in the village. The number of Strzeleczki's residents began to decline due to emigration in search of work in the industrial centres of Upper Silesia.

=== World War II ===
209 men from Strzeleczki died at the front during the Second World War. Two forcer labor units for British and Soviet prisoners of war who worked in local farms, as well as a forced labor camp for Jews, were located in Strzeleczki. Two Polish citizens were murdered by Nazi Germany in the village during World War II. Retreating Wehrmacht soldiers killed Polish farm workers because they expressed joy at the approaching Soviet Red Army.

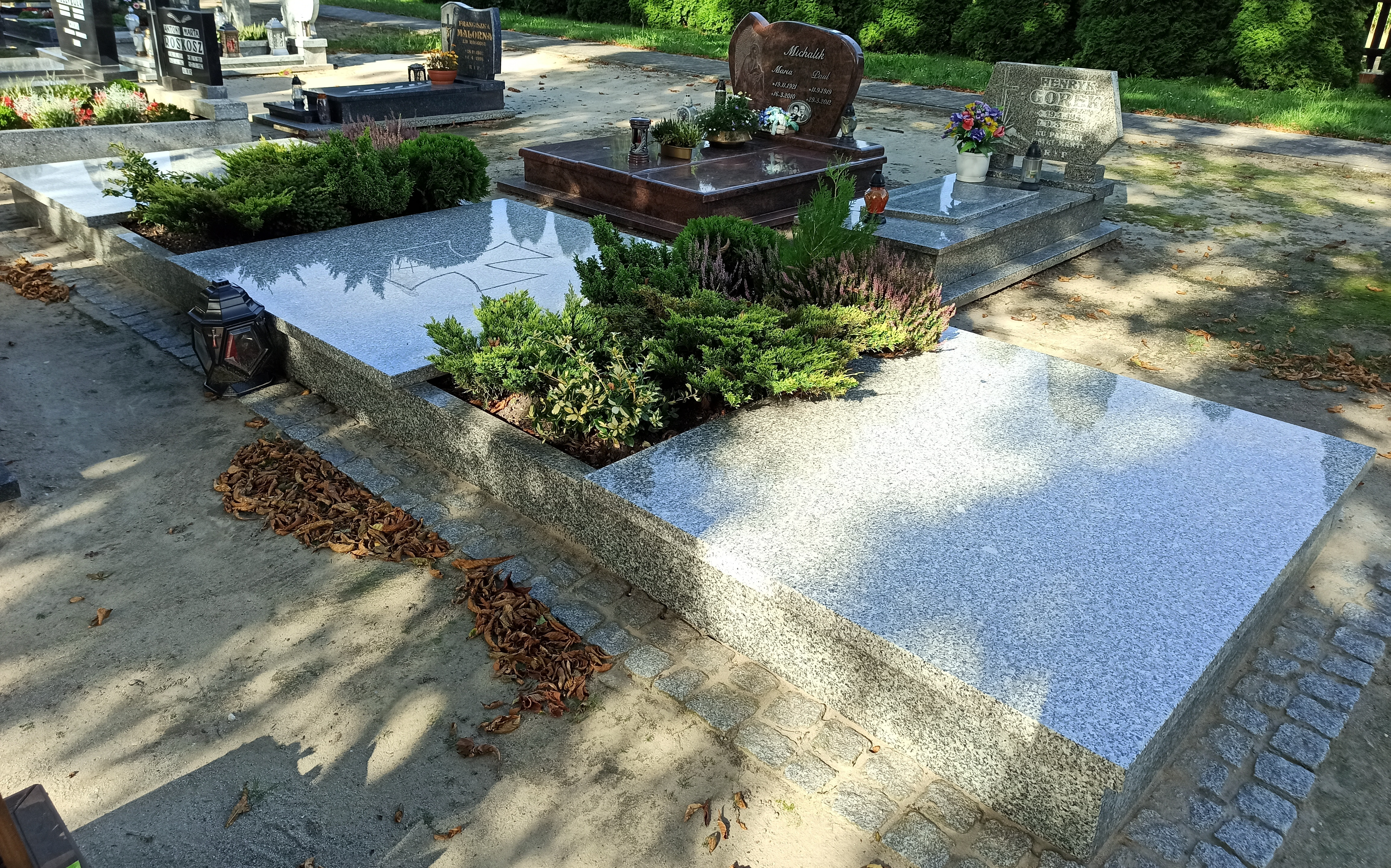
A grave of German soldiers at the Strzeleczki cemetery

In March 1945, Strzeleczki was one of the localities of Prudnik County that were adapted by the Germans to defend against the Red Army. Field-type fortifications were built on the surrounding farmlands. The Red Army captured Strzeleczki on 19 March 1945 while on its way to Prudnik as part of the Upper Silesian offensive. Most residents were evacuated or fled before the arrival of the Soviets. The village was not heavily damaged by the fightings. During the battle of Prudnik in April and May 1945, Soviets temporarily evacuated German and Polish civilians of Prudnik and surrounding villages to Strzeleczki.

=== Modern Poland ===
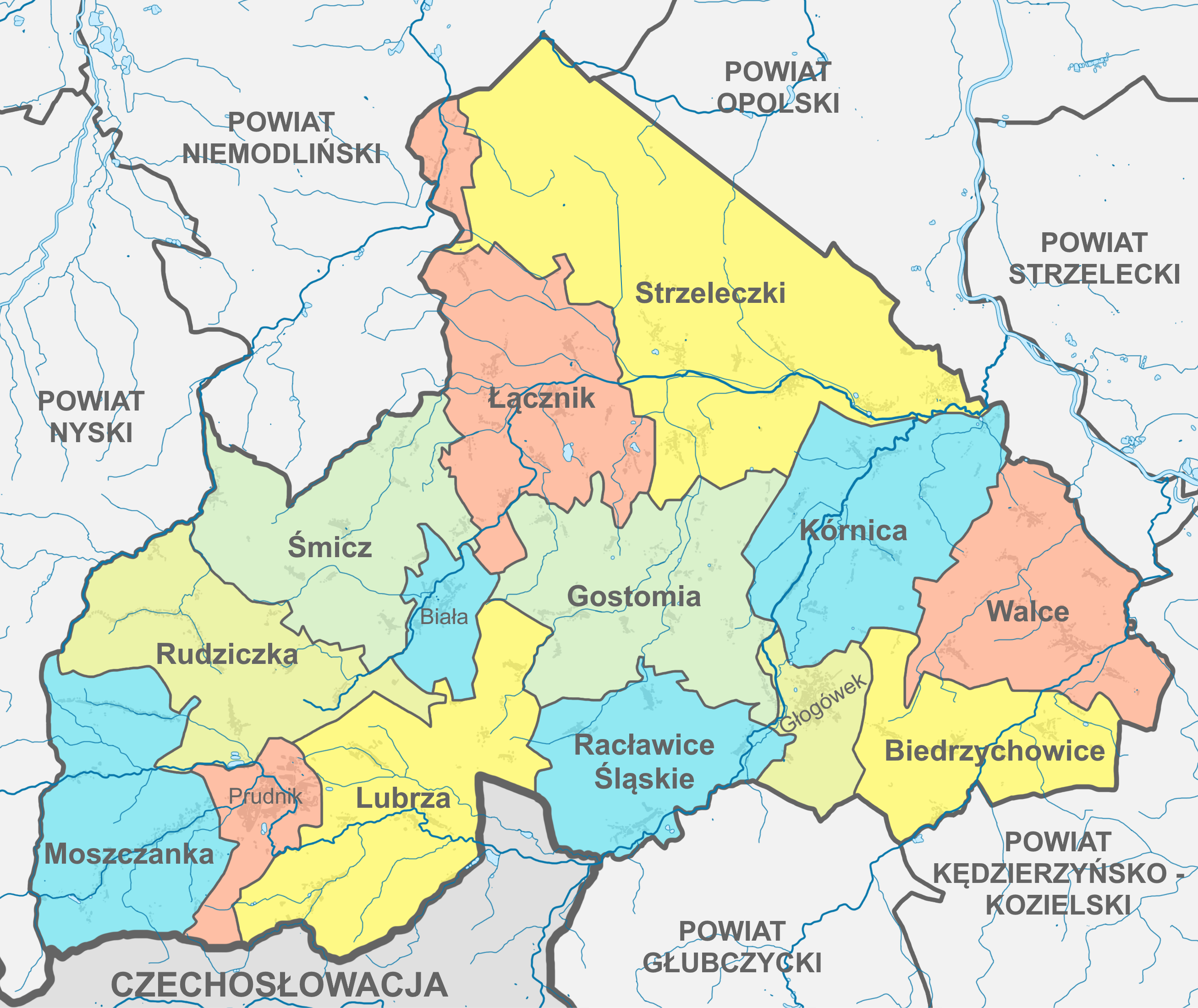
Gmina Strzeleczki within Prudnik County in 1954

Following the Second World War, from March to May 1945 Prudnik County was controlled by the Soviet military commandant's office. On 11 May 1945, it was passed on to the Polish administration. Autochthonous inhabitants of Strzeleczki, who either spoke Silesian or knew Polish, were allowed to remain in the village. Some German families were expelled in June 1946.

The village became a part of Silesian Voivodeship in 1945. It belongs to Opole Voivodeship since 1950. In the years 1945–1954, the village was the seat of Gmina Strzeleczki in Prudnik County. From 1954 until 1973, it was the seat of a local gromada (the lowest tier of local government). There was a post office in the village.

School Inspectorate in Prudnik opened the primary school in Strzeleczki on 9 July 1945. A cultural centre was established in 1946, and in 1947, a library was opened. In 1950, the management of the hospital in Prudnik founded a maternity ward in Strzeleczki. A textile factory was established in 1953. The village was incorporated into Krapkowice County in 1956.

Since 2022, local authorities have been trying to re-grant Strzeleczki town status. Their efforts were successful, and Strzeleczki became a town again on 1 January 2024.

== Demographics ==
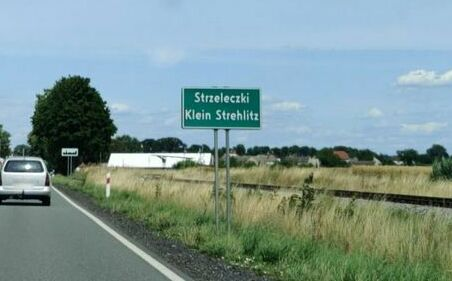
Bilingual Polish-German name sign

Strzeleczki is inhabited by Poles, Silesians and Germans. They belong to the registered German minority in Poland. The town has one of the highest concentrations of Germans in Poland. The residents speak the Prudnik dialect of the Silesian language. The town gained the bilingual Polish-German status in 2008.

== Coat of arms ==
The coat of arms of the town most likely comes from the Barons of Promnitz-Pless. The current emblem is based on a drawing made by Heraldic artist Otto Hupp in 1898.

== Sights ==
Landmarks of Strzeleczki are the Baroque Saint Martin church and the Exaltation of the Holy Cross church. There is an old monument of Saint John of Nepomuk. There are graves of troops killed during World War II, a war memorial dedicated to soldiers from the village who died in World Wars I and II, and a grave of Włodzimierz Prokaziuk, a Polish man executed by the Germans during World War II.

== Transport ==
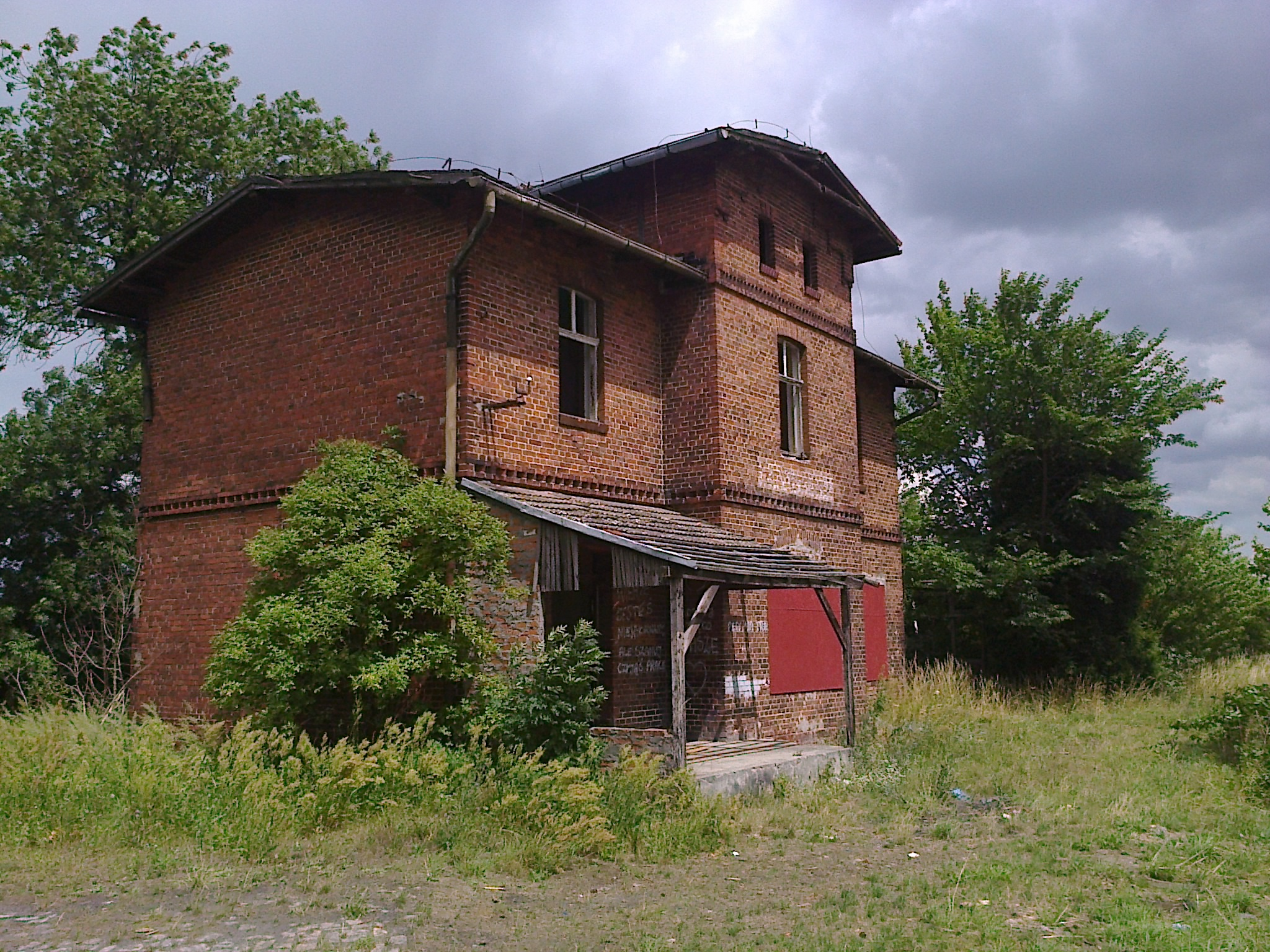
Former railway stop

The Krapkowice–Prudnik railway (rail line number 306), used only for freight and tourist traffic, runs through Strzeleczki. The town used to have a railway stop. The closest active railway station is located in Prudnik. Voivodeship road 409 also runs through the town. The local public transport buses were operated by PKS Prudnik. Since 2021, public transit is organized by the PGZT "Pogranicze" corporation in Prudnik.

== Notable people ==
- Lothar Stark (1876–1944), film producer

== Bibliography ==
- Lesiuk, Wiesław (1978). Ziemia Prudnicka. Dzieje, gospodarka, kultura. Urząd Miasta i Gminy w Prudniku, Wydawnictwo Instytutu Śląskiego w Opolu. OCLC 251643861.
- Hellfeier, Robert (2014). Smolarnia – 350 lat historii (PDF). Smolarnia: Gmina Strzeleczki. ISBN 978-83-63233-26-6.
- Kasza, Ryszard (2018). Powiat prudnicki – historia dawną fotografią pisana. Prudnik: Powiat Prudnicki. ISBN 978-83-931068-0-6.
- "Plan Odnowy Miejscowości Strzeleczki na lata 2011–2020" (PDF). bip.strzeleczki.pl (in Polish). 2018-03-22.
- Ogiolda, Krzysztof (2020-01-03). "Strzeleczki mają monografię, czyli nowe życie lokalnej historii" (PDF). Nowa Trybuna Opolska. Pro-Media Sp. z o.o.
- Kasza, Ryszard (2020). Ulicami Prudnika z historią i fotografią w tle. Prudnik: Powiat Prudnicki. ISBN 978-83-954314-5-6.
- Dereń, Andrzej (2024-01-10). "Strzeleczki ponownie miastem: Czwarte miasto ziemi prudnickiej". Tygodnik Prudnicki. Vol. 2, no. 1716. Prudnik: Spółka Wydawnicza "Aneks".
