= Stare Kotkowice =

Stare Kotkowice Alt Kuttendorf
- Village
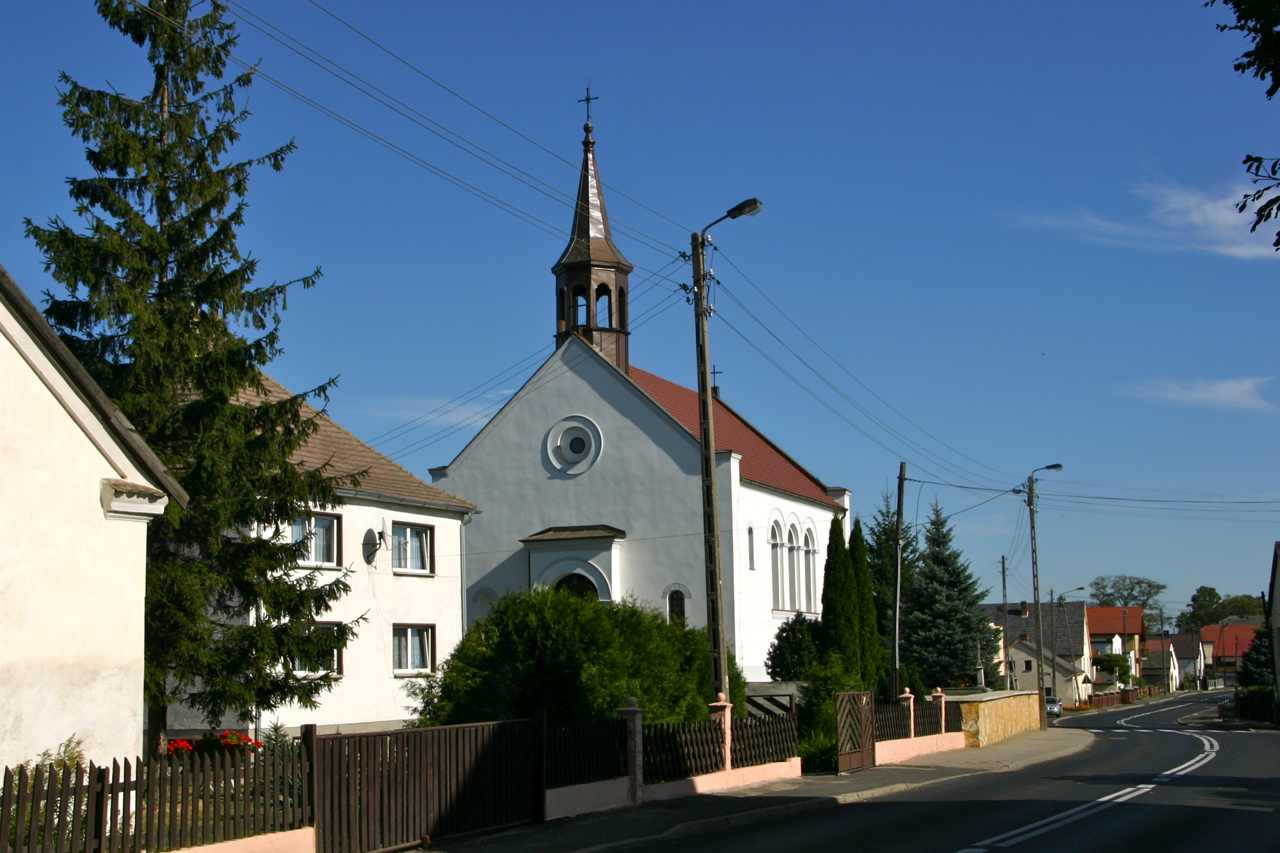

- Location within Poland
- Coordinates: 50°20′33″N 17°54′18″E
- Country: Poland
- Voivodeship: Opole
- County: Prudnik
- Gmina: Głogówek
- First mentioned: 13th century
- Time zone: UTC+1 (CET)
  - Summer (DST): UTC+2 (CEST)
- Vehicle registration: OPR

Stare Kotkowice [ˈstarɛ kɔtkɔˈvit͡sɛ], additional name in German: Alt Kuttendorf, is a village in the administrative district of Gmina Głogówek, within Prudnik County, Opole Voivodeship, in southern Poland, close to the Czech border.

== History ==
There are Neolithic archaeological sites in Stare Kotkowice.

The earliest record of the village comes from a 13th-century act of donation by Duke Casimir I of Opole to the monastery in Czarnowąsy. A document of Duke Bolko V the Hussite from 1430 noted a church in the village and a conflict between the parish priest from nearby Biedrzychowice and the villagers of Kotkowice.

Since 2009, in addition to the official Polish language, German has also been recognized as an additional secondary language.

== See also ==
- Prudnik Land
