= Piorunkowice =

- Village
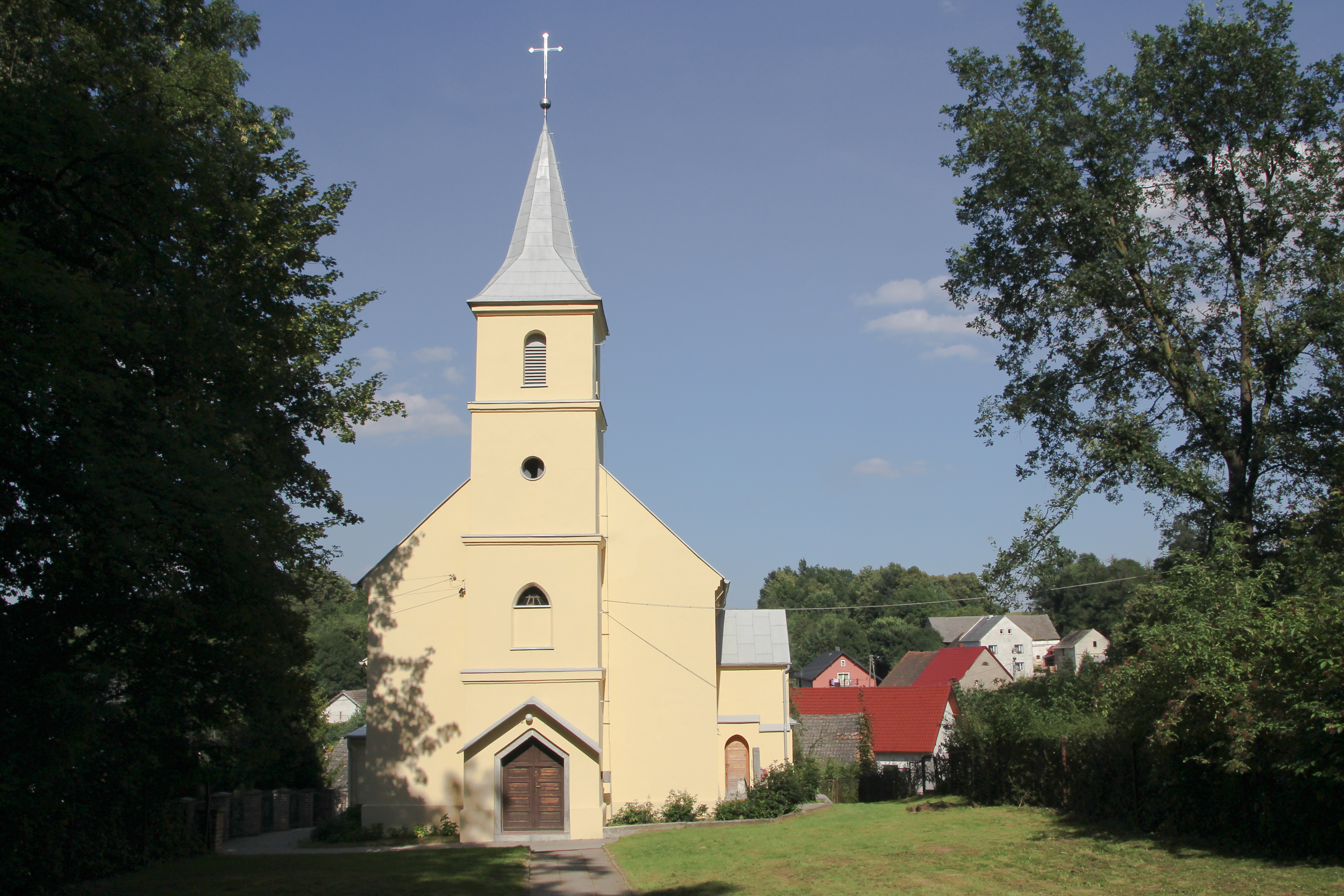

- Location within Poland
- Coordinates: 50°24′16″N 17°30′44″E
- Country: Poland
- Voivodeship: Opole
- County: Prudnik
- Gmina: Prudnik
- Population: 225

Piorunkowice [pjɔrunkɔˈvit͡sɛ] (German: Schweinsdorf) is a village in the administrative district of Gmina Prudnik, within Prudnik County, Opole Voivodeship, in south-western Poland, close to the Czech border. It lies approximately 11 km (7 mi) north-west of Prudnik and 42 km (26 mi) south-west of the regional capital Opole.

== See also ==
- Prudnik Land
