= Prudnik Castle =

- Zamek w Prudniku (Polish); Wogendrüssel (German)
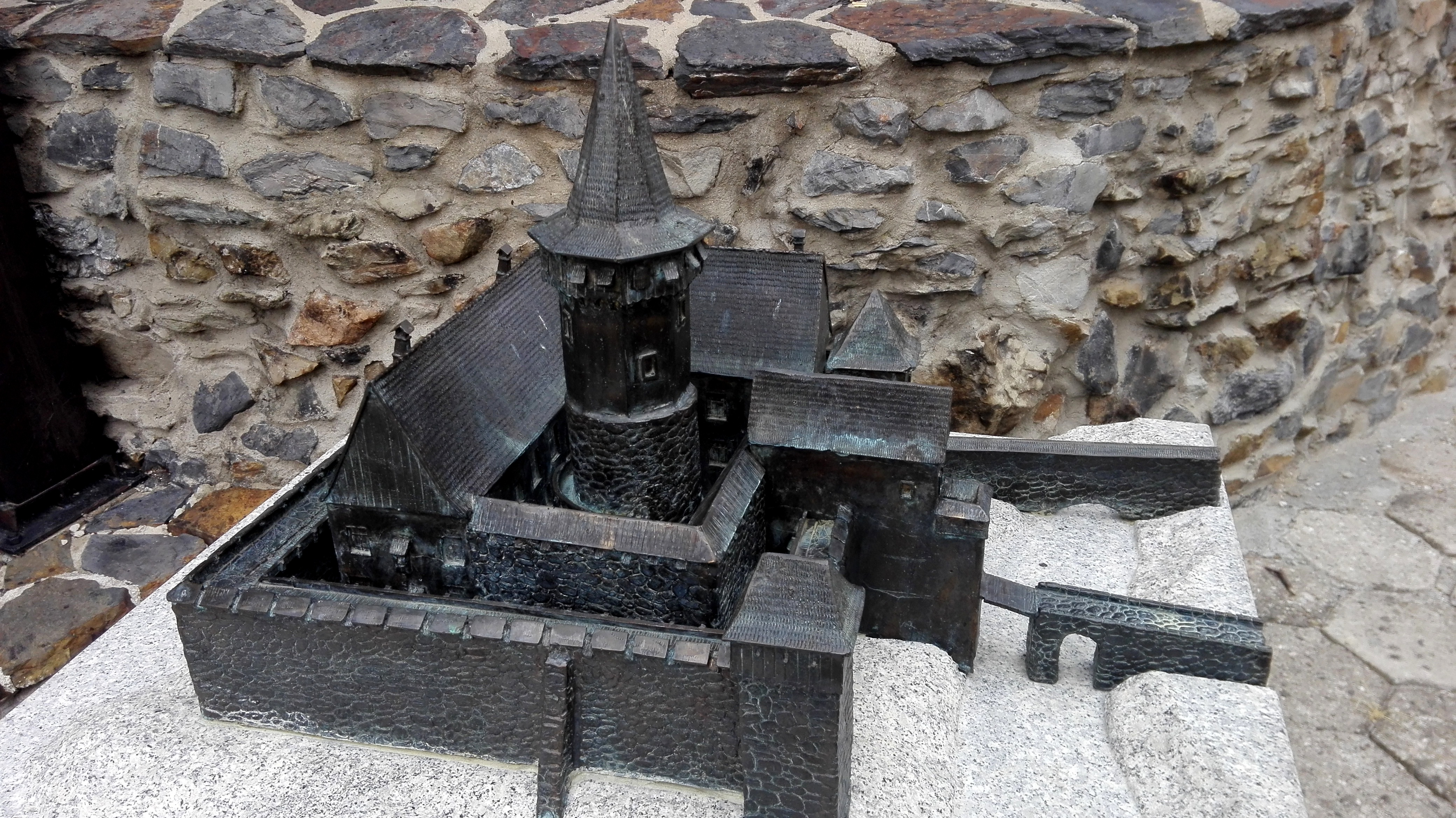
- Model of the castle

- Location within Poland Location within Opole Voivodeship
- 50.322958°N 17.578392°E
- Location: Prudnik, Opole Voivodeship, Poland

History
- Built: 1255
- Built for: Wok of Rosenberg
- Demolished: 27 August 1806

Site notes
- Architectural style: Gothic

Prudnik Castle was a gothic castle located in Prudnik, Opole Voivodeship, within the Upper Silesia region of Poland.

== History ==
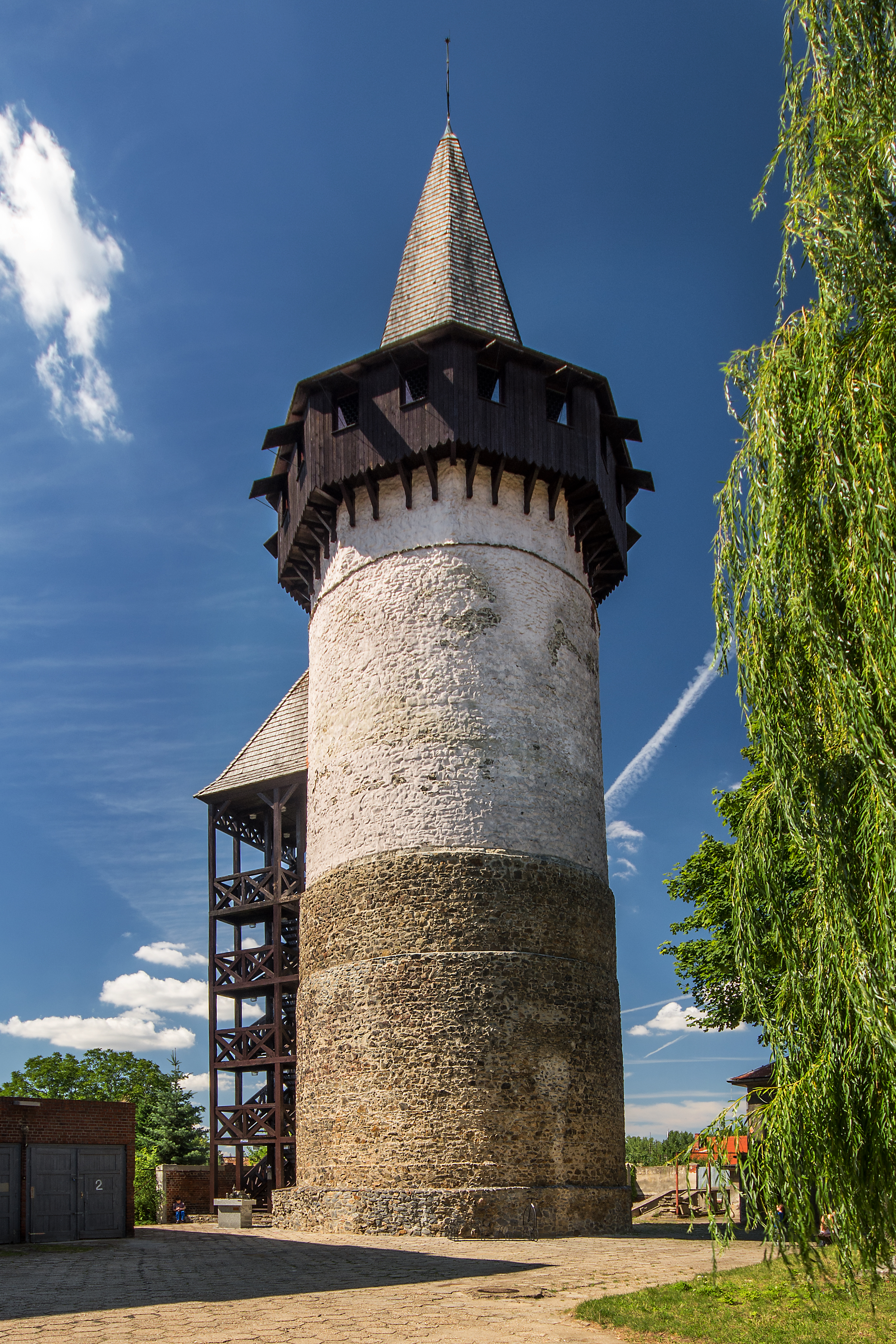
The surviving Wok's Tower

Prudnik Castle was located in the defensive bend of the Prudnik river. It was built in 1255. It was founded a Czech knight Wok of Rosenberg.

The castle was destroyed in 1428 by the Hussites. After the end of the first Silesian War, Frederick the Great rebuilt the castle.

A fire on 27 August 1806 burnt the entire castle except of one tower called "Wok's Tower", which is now the only remnant of the castle.
