= Zwiastowice =

Zwiastowice Schwesterwitz
- Village
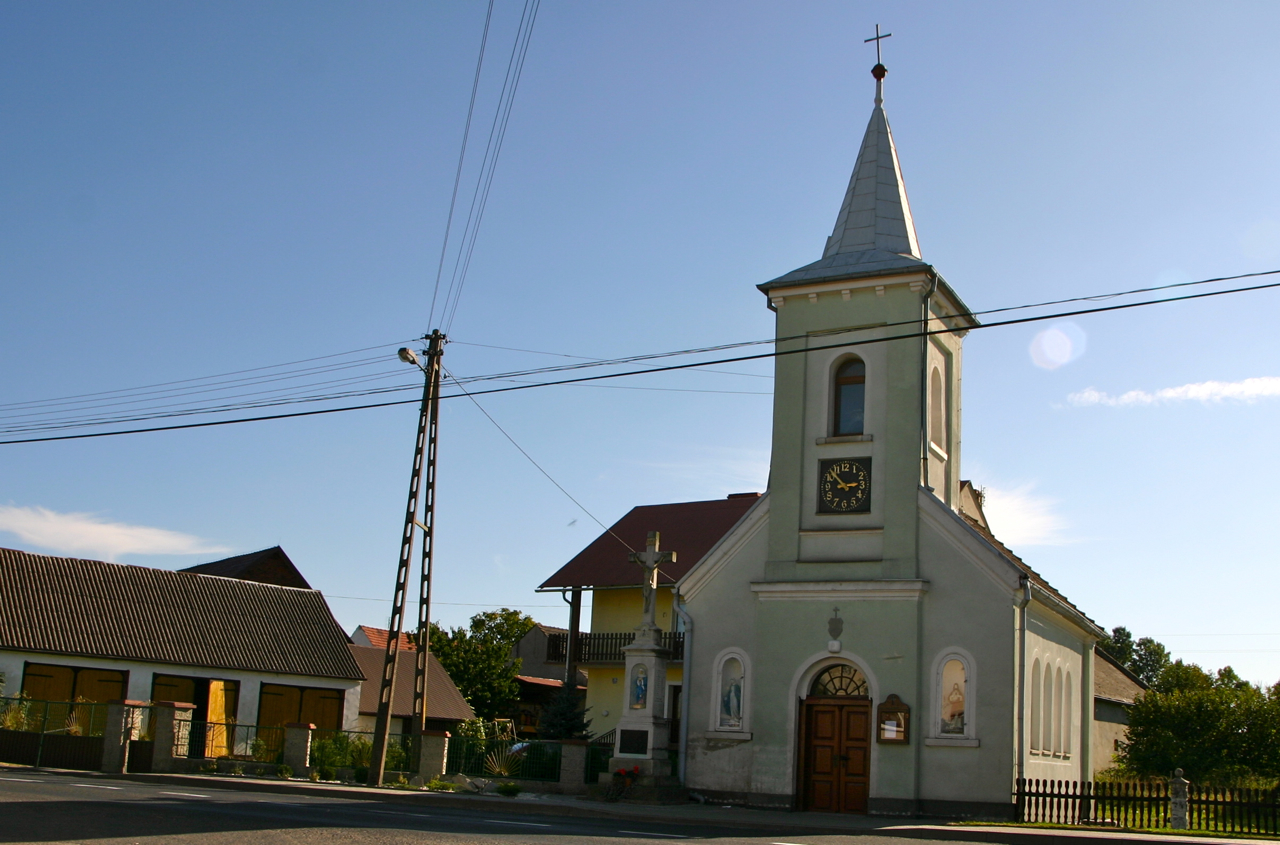
- Chapel of the Visitation of the Blessed Virgin Mary in Zwiastowice

- Location within Poland
- Coordinates: 50°20′9″N 17°57′59″E
- Country: Poland
- Voivodeship: Opole
- County: Prudnik
- Gmina: Głogówek
- First mentioned: 1233
- Time zone: UTC+1 (CET)
  - Summer (DST): UTC+2 (CEST)
- Vehicle registration: OPR

Zwiastowice [zvjastɔˈvit͡sɛ], additional name in German: Schwesterwitz, is a village in the administrative district of Gmina Głogówek, within Prudnik County, Opole Voivodeship, in southern Poland, close to the Czech border.

The village is named after a person named Zwiast, and was mentioned under the Latinized Old Polish name Zuestoua in a document from 1233. It was a possession of the Cistercians until secularization in 1810.

== See also ==
- Prudnik Land
