= Dembowski =

Dembowski (meaning one from Dębowa) may refer to:

== Astronomy ==
- Dembowski (crater), an impact crater on the Moon
- 349 Dembowska, a main belt asteroid

== People ==
- Bronisław Dembowski (1927–2019), Polish bishop
- Edward Dembowski (1822–1846), philosopher and Polish independence fighter
- Ercole Dembowski (1812–1881), Italian astronomer
- Jan Dembowski (1770-1823), Polish general
- Jan Bohdan Dembowski (1889–1963), Polish biologist
- Kazimierz Dembowski (1912–1942), Polish Jesuit
- Ludwik Mateusz Dembowski (1768–1812), Polish general
- Nancy Dembowski, American politician
- Peter Dembowski (1928–1971), German mathematician
- Rod Dembowski, American politician

== See also ==
- Dabrowski (disambiguation)
