= Dąbrowski =

Dąbrowski
Origin
- Meaning: Polish toponym; oak grove
- Region of origin: Poland

Other names
- Variant forms: Dabrowski, Dombrowski, Dobrowski, Dobrosky, Dombroski, Dombrosky (uncommon)

Dąbrowski (Polish pronunciation: [dɔmˈbrɔfskʲi]; feminine Dąbrowska, plural Dąbrowscy) or Dabrowski is the 11th most common surname in Poland (87,304 people in 2009); this is down from an apparent rank of 4th in 1990.

Dąbrowski is a habitational name derived from the placename Dąbrowa or Dąbrówka, which is used for several specific places in Poland or generically as "oak grove", the English meaning for these Polish words. Variants of the surname include Dombrowski, Dobrowski, and Dobrosky. Dobrowski also has an independent origin as a habitational name derived from the placename 'Dobrów'. The text-figure below summarizes the relationships among these various words. In other Slavic countries, the same surname takes the form Dubrovsky, as the Polish "ą" corresponds to "u" in most other Slavic languages.

Dąbrowa (or) Dąbrówka	→	Dąbrow(ski/ska/scy)	→	Dabrowski	→	Dobrowski	→	Dobrosky
						↑
						Dobrów

== Related surnames ==
Polish "ą" (pronounced "om") corresponds to "u" in most other Slavic languages, i.e. Dąbrowski is equivalent to Dubrovsky in Ukraine and Russia. The latter countries also have forms such as "Dombrovsky" but at a lower frequency and often associated with Polish ancestry.

Language	Masculine	Feminine
Polish	Dąbrowski	Dąbrowska
Belarusian (Romanization)	Дуброўскі (Dubroŭski); Домброўскі (Dombroŭski); Дамброўскі (Dambroŭski)	Дуброўская (Dubroŭskaja, Dubrouskaya, Dubrouskaia); Домброўская (Dombroŭskaja, Dombrouskaya, Dombrouskaia); Дамброўская (Dambroŭskaja, Dambrouskaya, Dambrouskaia)
Czech, Slovak	Dubrovský / Dombrovský	Dubrovská / Dombrovská
Latvian	Dombrovskis	Dombrovska
Lithuanian	Dambrauskas / Dubrauskas	Dambrauskienė / Dubrauskienė (married); Dambrauskaitė / Dubrauskaitė (unmarried)
Russian (Romanization)	Дубровский (Dubrovsky, Dubrovskiy, Dubrovskij); Домбровский (Dombrovsky, Dombrovskiy, Dombrovskij)	Дубровская (Dubrovskaya, Dubrovskaia, Dubrovskaja; Домбровская (Dombrovskaya, Dombrovskaia, Dombrovskaja)
Ukrainian (Romanization)	Дубровський (Dubrovskyi, Dubrovskyy, Dubrovskyj); Домбровський (Dombrovskyi, Dombrovskyy, Dombrovskyj)	Дубровська (Dubrovska); Домбровська (Dombrovska)

== Frequency ==
The table below contains available information on the frequency of the Dąbrowski surname and variants in various countries across a span of years.

Detection of surname variant by country (blank = no data; green background = high frequency)
Country	Dąbrow(ski/ska/scy)	Dabrowski	Dobrowski	Dobrosky
Australia		2002: 32.2 per million		
Canada		1998: 37.4 per million		
France	c.2007: undetectable	c.2007: Rank=10,628; 817	c.2007: undetectable	
Germany				
New Zealand		2002: 6.57 per million		
Northern Ireland		2003: undetectable		
Poland	1990: Rank=4; 92,945. c.2000: Rank=11; 86,132.	1990: 131	1990: 18	1990: undectable
Republic of Ireland		2003: undetectable		
Scotland	undetectable			
Sweden	1998–2007: undetectable			
United Kingdom	1881: undetectable 1998: undetectable	1881: undetectable 1998: 6 per million; Rank = 15,037	1881: undetectable 1998: undetectable	
United States	1990: undetectable	1990: Rank=10,244; 0.001% 1998: 17.2 per million	1990: Rank=64,522	1990: Rank=73,494

== Notable people sharing the Dąbrowski surname or variants ==
=== Historically notable people ===
Dąbrowski

- Franciszek Dąbrowski
- Jan Henryk Dąbrowski (18th century), Polish general known for organizing the Polish Legions in Italy during the Napoleonic Wars
- Kazimierz Dąbrowski (20th century), Polish psychologist who developed the theory of Positive Disintegration
- Marian Dąbrowski (20th century), journalist and press magnate of the Second Polish Republic

Żądło-Dąbrowski z Dąbrówki h. Radwan noble family

- Jarosław Dąbrowski (19th century), Polish general depicted on the obverse of the 1976 200-zloty banknote

=== Other notable people ===
Dąbrowski/Dąbrowska

- Ania Dąbrowska (born 1981), Polish singer and composer
- Bartłomiej Dąbrowski (born 1972), Polish tennis player
- Damian Dąbrowski, Polish footballer
- Daniel Dąbrowski (born 1983), Polish sprinter
- Dorota Dąbrowska, Polish statistician
- Izabela Dąbrowska (born 1966), Polish actress
- Helena Dąbrowska (1923–2003), Polish actress
- Jerzy Dąbrowski (1899–1967), 20th century Polish aeronautical engineer
- Józef Dąbrowski (19th century Polish Catholic priest)
- Katarzyna Dąbrowska (born 1984), Polish television actress
- Kazimierz Dąbrowski (1902–1980), Polish psychologist, psychiatrist, physician, and poet
- Kazimierz Dąbrowski (field hockey) (1936–2025), Polish field hockey player
- Kevin Dąbrowski (born 1998), Polish footballer
- Krystyna Dąbrowska (1906–1944), Polish sculptor and painter
- Krystyna Dąbrowska (born 1973), Polish chess player
- Maciej Dąbrowski (born 1987), Polish footballer
- Małgorzata Dąbrowska (born 1956), Polish historian and Byzantinist
- Maria Dąbrowska (1889–1965), 20th century Polish writer
- Marek Dąbrowski (born 1949), Polish fencer
- Martyna Dąbrowska (born 1994), Polish athlete
- Renata Dąbrowska (born 1989), Polish cyclist
- Roman Dąbrowski (born 1972), Polish footballer
- Witold Dąbrowski (1932–2025), Polish politician
- Władysław Dąbrowski (born 1947), Polish footballer
- Włodzimierz Dąbrowski (1892–1942), 20th century Polish political activist

Dąbrowski → Dabrowski

- Christoph Dabrowski (born 1978), Polish/German footballer
- Gabriela Dabrowski (born 1992), Canadian tennis player
- Joseph Dabrowski (born 1964), Polish-Canadian Catholic bishop
- Ricardo Dabrowski (born 1961), Argentine football player and manager
- Stanislawa Dabrowski (1926–2020), Australian humanitarian
- Stina Lundberg Dabrowski (born 1950), Swedish journalist

Dąbrowski → Dobrowski

- Jody Dobrowski (1981–2005), English hate crime victim

Dąbrowski → Dombroski

- Amy Dombroski (1987–2013), American cyclist
- Paul Dombroski (born 1956), American football player
- Thiago Dombroski (born 2002), also known as Thiagão, Brazilian footballer
- Trey Dombroski (born 2001), American baseball player
- Vicky Dombroski, New Zealand rugby union coach
- Vinnie Dombroski (born 1962), American musician

Dąbrowski → Dombrowski

- Andreas Dombrowski (1894–unknown), Czech WWI flying ace
- Brandyn Dombrowski (born 1985), American professional football player
- Daniel Dombrowski (born 1953), American philosopher and university professor
- Dave Dombrowski (born 1956), American baseball executive
- Chad Dombrowski (born 1980), American professional soccer player
- Karl von Dombrowski (1872–1951), German animal and hunting painter
- Neil Dombrowski (born 1984), American professional soccer player
- Tighe Dombrowski (born 1982), American professional soccer player
- Zeke Dombrowski (born 1986), American professional soccer player
- James A. Dombrowski (1897–1983), American civil rights activist and minister
- Jan Dombrowski (1926–1992), Polish bobsledder
- Jim Dombrowski (born 1963), American professional football player
- Joe Dombrowski (born 1991), American professional cyclist for UCI ProTeam Cannondale-Garmin
- Lutz Dombrowski (born 1959), German Olympic track and field athlete
- Sandra Dombrowski, Swiss ice hockey player and referee
- Yury Dombrovsky (1909–1978), Russian writer

== See also ==
- Dąbrowa (disambiguation)
- Dąbrówka (disambiguation)
- Dąbrowski (disambiguation)

== General and cited references ==
- "Dabrowski Name Meaning and History". The Dabrowski Surname. Ancestry.com.
- "Dobrowski Name Meaning and History". The Dobrowski Surname. Ancestry.com.
- "Dobrosky Name Meaning and History". The Dobrosky Surname. Ancestry.com.
- "L'encyclopédie des noms de familles". Le Journal des Femmes (in French). Benchmark Group. c. 2007.
- Longley, Paul; Alex Singleton; Richard Webber; Daryl Lloyd. "Statistics on the selected name or category of names". SPLINT Project, University College London. The National Trust.
- Marek Futrega (8 November 2006). "Najpopularniejsze nazwiska w Polsce" (in Polish). (self-published). Archived from the original on 18 May 2008.
- Rymut, Kazimierz (1990). "Slownik nazwisk wspolczesnie w Polsce uzywanych" (in Polish). Osrodek Dokumentacji Wychodztwa Polskiego przy Domu Polonii w Pultusku. Note: Data is not complete, accounting for ~94% of the population in 1990.
- SCB staff. "Efterfrågade tabeller och diagram". Namnstatistik (in Swedish). Statistics Sweden. Archived from the original on 16 August 2009. Note: Google searches were conducted against "site:scb.se" to verify availability of surnames online.
- Smith, Elsdon (1972). New Dictionary of American Family Names (Internet Archive "snippet view"). San Francisco: Harper & Row. p. 105. ISBN 0-06-013933-1. "dabrowski." Note: some sources place the date of publication at 1972, others at 1973.
- "Surnames in Scotland over the last 140 years". Occasional papers. General Register Office for Scotland. 2 October 2007. Archived from the original on 23 March 2010.
- United States Census Bureau staff (7 September 2000). "Search names from 1990 Census". United States Census Bureau. Archived from the original (Database search result) on 7 February 1997.
- Zawadzki, Jarosław Maciej (2002). 1000 najpopularniejszych nazwisk w Polsce (1000 of the most popular names in Poland). Świat Książki. ISBN 83-7311-265-0. Book not available for review by editor; citation obtained from List of most common surnames.
