= Dubrovsky (rural locality) =

Dubrovsky (Russian: Дубровский; masculine), Dubrovskaya (Дубровская; feminine), or Dubrovskoye (Дубровское; neuter) is the name of several rural localities in Russia:

- Dubrovsky, Altai Krai, a settlement in Kirovsky Selsoviet of Aleysky District of Altai Krai
- Dubrovsky, Kaluga Oblast, a selo in Sukhinichsky District of Kaluga Oblast
- Dubrovsky, Kirov Oblast, a pochinok in Lazarevsky Rural Okrug of Urzhumsky District of Kirov Oblast
- Dubrovsky, Moscow Oblast, a settlement in Bulatnikovskoye Rural Settlement of Leninsky District of Moscow Oblast
- Dubrovsky, Sholokhovsky District, Rostov Oblast, a khutor in Dubrovskoye Rural Settlement of Sholokhovsky District of Rostov Oblast
- Dubrovsky, Verkhnedonskoy District, Rostov Oblast, a khutor in Solontsovskoye Rural Settlement of Verkhnedonskoy District of Rostov Oblast
- Dubrovsky, Udmurt Republic, a village in Lutokhinsky Selsoviet of Kiyasovsky District of the Udmurt Republic
- Dubrovsky, Vladimir Oblast, a station in Gus-Khrustalny District of Vladimir Oblast
- Dubrovsky, Kikvidzensky District, Volgograd Oblast, a khutor in Dubrovsky Selsoviet of Kikvidzensky District of Volgograd Oblast
- Dubrovsky, Uryupinsky District, Volgograd Oblast, a khutor in Iskrinsky Selsoviet of Uryupinsky District of Volgograd Oblast
- Dubrovskoye, Republic of Mordovia, a selo in Ladsky Selsoviet of Ichalkovsky District of the Republic of Mordovia
- Dubrovskoye, Moscow Oblast, a village in Kostrovskoye Rural Settlement of Istrinsky District of Moscow Oblast
- Dubrovskoye, Penza Oblast, a selo in Komsomolsky Selsoviet of Lopatinsky District of Penza Oblast
- Dubrovskoye, Vologda Oblast, a settlement in Semenkovsky Selsoviet of Vologodsky District of Vologda Oblast
- Dubrovskaya, Orlovsky Selsoviet, Ustyansky District, Arkhangelsk Oblast, a village in Orlovsky Selsoviet of Ustyansky District of Arkhangelsk Oblast
- Dubrovskaya, Rostovsky Selsoviet, Ustyansky District, Arkhangelsk Oblast, a village in Rostovsky Selsoviet of Ustyansky District of Arkhangelsk Oblast
