= Dubrovsky =

Dubrovsky (masculine), Dubrovskaya (feminine), or Dubrovskoye (neuter) may refer to:

== Arts ==
- Dubrovsky (novel), an unfinished novel by Alexander Pushkin
- Dubrovsky (opera), an 1895 opera
- Dubrovsky (film), a 1936 Soviet drama film

== People ==
- Alan Dubrovsky, a character from Shortland Street
- Boris Dubrovsky (politician) (born 1958), Russian politician
- Boris Dubrovskiy (1939–2023), Soviet rower
- Dmitry Dubrovsky (born 1974), Russian skier
- Natalia Poklonskaya (née Dubrovskaya, 1980), Russian politician.
- Peter P. Dubrovsky (1754–1816), Russian diplomat
- Stanislav Dubrovsky (born 1974), Russian skier

== Places ==
- Dubrovsky District, a district of Bryansk Oblast, Russia
- Dubrovskoye Urban Settlement, several municipal urban settlements in Russia
- Dubrovsky (rural locality), several rural localities in Russia

== See also ==
- Dąbrowski (disambiguation)
- Dubrovka (disambiguation)
- Dubrov
