= Bytków =

Bytków may refer to the following places in Poland:

- Bytków, Lower Silesian Voivodeship (south-west Poland)
- Bytków, Opole Voivodeship (south-west Poland)
- Bytków, Silesian Voivodeship - one of the administrative divisions of Siemianowice Śląskie (south Poland)
