= Dambrauskas =

Dambrauskas is a Lithuanian surname, a variant of Polish surname Dąbrowski. Notable people with the surname include:

- Paulius Dambrauskas (born 1991), Lithuanian basketball player
- Valdas Dambrauskas (born 1977), Lithuanian football manager
- Virginijus Dambrauskas (born 1962), Lithuanian chess master
