= Kondratyevsky =

Kondratyevsky Кондратьевский
- Settlement
- Location within Altai Krai Location within Russia
- Coordinates: 52°42′N 82°51′E
- Country: Russia
- Region: Altai Krai
- District: Aleysky District
- Time zone: UTC+7:00

Kondratyevsky (Russian: Кондратьевский) is a rural locality (a settlement) in Kirovsky Selsoviet, Aleysky District, Altai Krai, Russia. The population was 56 as of 2013. There are 2 streets.

== Geography ==
Kondratyevsky is located 34 km north of Aleysk (the district's administrative centre) by road. Novonikolsky is the nearest rural locality.
