= Dobrovský =

Dobrovský (feminine: Dobrovská) is a Czech surname. Notable people with the surname include:

- Josef Dobrovský (1753–1829), Czech philologist and historian
- Luboš Dobrovský (1932–2020), Czech journalist and politician

== See also ==
- Dobrovsky (disambiguation)
- Dąbrowski (disambiguation)
