= 1904 Massevitch =

Rare-type main-belt asteroid

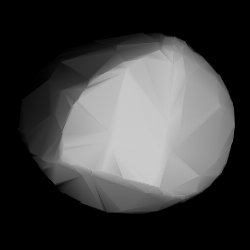
- Massevitch modeled from its lightcurve

Discovery
- Discovered by: T. Smirnova
- Discovery site: Crimean Astrophysical Obs.
- Discovery date: 9 May 1972

Designations
- Named after: Alla Massevitch (astronomer)
- Alternative designations: 1972 JM · 1949 JH; 1951 XN · 1958 JA; 1962 CE · 1965 YH; 1971 BF
- Minor planet category: main-belt · (middle)

Orbital characteristics
- Epoch 4 September 2017 (JD 2458000.5)
- Uncertainty parameter 0
- Observation arc: 68.09 yr (24,870 days)
- Aphelion: 2.9442 AU
- Perihelion: 2.5477 AU
- Semi-major axis: 2.7460 AU
- Eccentricity: 0.0722
- Orbital period (sidereal): 4.55 yr (1,662 days)
- Mean anomaly: 218.92°
- Mean motion: 0° 12^{m} 59.76^{s} / day
- Inclination: 12.817°
- Longitude of ascending node: 106.40°
- Argument of perihelion: 261.22°

Physical characteristics
- Dimensions: 13.503±0.211 km 18.19 km (IRAS); 18.25 km (derived)
- Synodic rotation period: 5.394±0.003 h
- Geometric albedo: 0.1613 (IRAS); 0.1756 (derived); 0.581±0.228
- Spectral type: SMASS = R
- Absolute magnitude (H): 10.55 · 11.2 · 11.21±0.49

1904 Massevitch (prov. designation: 1972 JM) is a background asteroid from the central region of the asteroid belt. It was discovered on 9 May 1972, by the Russian astronomer Tamara Smirnova at the Crimean Astrophysical Observatory in Nauchnyj, on the Crimean peninsula. The uncommon R-type asteroid has a rotation period of 5.3 hours and measures approximately 16 kilometers (9.9 miles) in diameter. It was later named after Russian astrophysicist Alla Masevich.

== Orbit ==
Massevitch orbits the Sun in the central main-belt at a distance of 2.5–2.9 AU once every 4 years and 7 months (1,662 days). Its orbit has an eccentricity of 0.07 and an inclination of 13° with respect to the ecliptic. It was first identified as 1949 JH at Goethe Link Observatory in 1949, extending the body's observation arc by 23 years prior to its discovery observation.

== Naming ==
This minor planet was named after Russian astrophysicist and astronomer Alla Masevich (born 1918), vice-president of the Astronomical Council of the former USSR Academy of Sciences (now Russian Academy of Sciences). In the former USSR, Massevitch organized the optical tracking of artificial satellites in Earth's orbit. The official naming citation was published by the Minor Planet Center on 20 February 1976 (M.P.C. 3936).

== Physical characteristics ==
The moderately bright R-type asteroid has a surface that strongly absorbs in the olivine and pyroxene spectral region, which give it its very reddish color.

=== Rotation period ===
In September 2014, a rotational lightcurve of Massevitch was obtained from photometric observations taken at the Oakley Southern Sky Observatory (E09) in Coonabarabran, Australia. It gave a rotation period of 5.394 hours with a brightness variation of 0.30 magnitude (U=3−)

=== Diameter and albedo ===
According to the surveys carried out by NASA's Wide-field Infrared Survey Explorer with its subsequent NEOWISE mission and the Infrared Astronomical Satellite IRAS, Massevitch measures 13.50 and 18.19 kilometers in diameter, and its surface has an albedo of 0.161 and 0.581, respectively, while the Collaborative Asteroid Lightcurve Link derives an albedo of 0.176 and a diameter of 18.25 kilometers with an absolute magnitude of 11.2.
