= Gierałtowice =

Gierałtowice may refer to the following villages in Poland:

- Gierałtowice, Lesser Poland Voivodeship (south-west Poland)
- Gierałtowice, Opole Voivodeship (south-west Poland)
- Gierałtowice, Silesian Voivodeship (south Poland)
