= S-type asteroid =

Asteroid spectral type indicating stony composition

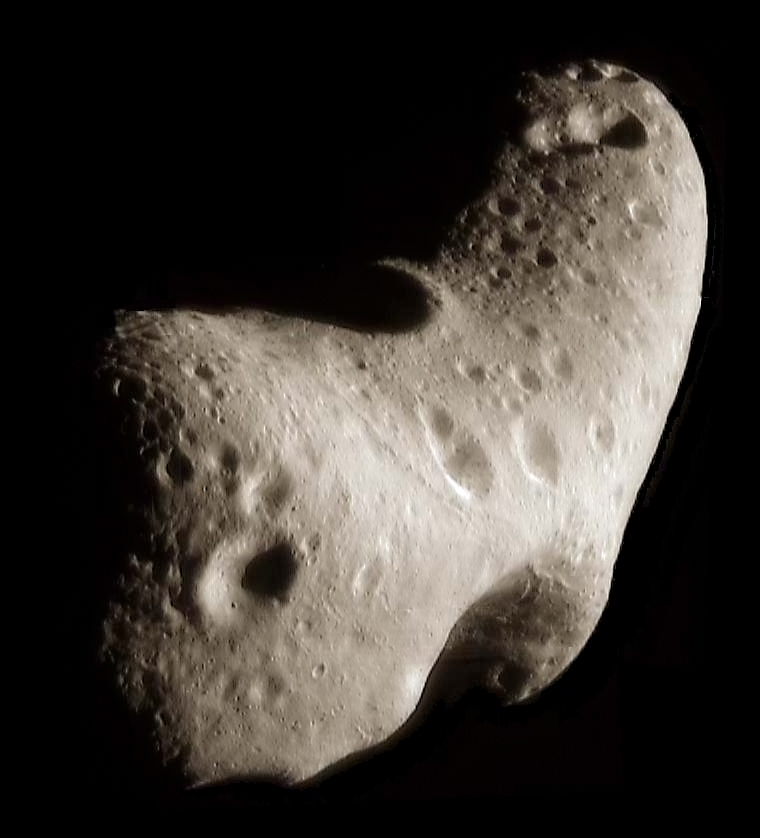
433 Eros, an example of an S-type asteroid

S-type (stony-type or siliceous-type) asteroids are asteroids with a spectral type that is indicative of a siliceous (i.e. stony) mineralogical composition, hence the name. They have relatively high density. Approximately 17% of asteroids are of this type, making it the second-most common after the carbonaceous C-type.

== Characteristics ==
S-type asteroids, with an astronomical albedo of typically 0.20, are moderately bright and consist mainly of iron- and magnesium-silicates. They are dominant in the inner part of the asteroid belt within 2.2 AU, common in the central belt within about 3 AU, but become rare farther out. The largest are 3 Juno (about 240–250 km across) and 15 Eunomia (230 km), with other large S-types being 29 Amphitrite, 532 Herculina and 7 Iris. These largest S-types are visible in 10x50 binoculars at most oppositions; the brightest, 7 Iris, can occasionally become brighter than +7.0, which is a higher magnitude than any asteroid except the unusually reflective 4 Vesta.

Their spectrum has a moderately steep slope at wavelengths shorter than 0.7 micrometres (μm), and has moderate to weak absorption features around 1 μm and 2 μm. The 1 μm absorption is indicative of the presence of silicates (stony minerals). Often there is also a broad but shallow absorption feature centered near 0.63 μm. The composition of these asteroids is similar to a variety of stony meteorites which share similar spectral characteristics.

Due to their volatile-poor (rocky) composition, S-type asteroids have relatively high density. A survey of 11 S-type asteroids found an average density of 3.0 g/cm^{3}.

== S-group asteroids ==
=== SMASS classification ===
In the SMASS classification, several generally "stony" types of asteroids are brought together into a wider S-group which contains the following types:

- A-type
- K-type
- L-type
- Q-type
- R-type
- a "core" S-type for asteroids having the most typical spectra for the S-group
- Sa, Sk, Sl, Sq, and Sr-types containing transition objects between the core S-type and the A, K, L, Q, and R-types, respectively. The entire "S"-assemblage of asteroids is spectrally quite distinct from the carbonaceous C-group and the often metallic X-group.

=== Tholen classification ===
In the Tholen classification, the S-type is a very broad grouping which includes all the types in the SMASS S-group except for the A, Q, and R, which have particularly strong "stony" absorption features around 1 μm.

=== Stony asteroid families ===
Prominent stony asteroid families with their typical albedo are the:

- Eos family (0.14)
- Eunomia family (0.21)
- Flora family (0.24)
- Koronis family (0.24)
- Hertha family (0.20; formerly known as the "Nysa family")
- Phocaea family (0.23)

== See also ==
- Asteroid spectral types
- X-type asteroid
