= Jan Dembowski =

Jan Dembowski may refer to:

- Jan Dembowski (general) (1770–1823), Polish general and politician
- Jan Dembowski (biologist) (1889–1963), Polish biologist and politician
