= Łężce, Opole Voivodeship =

Łężce Lenschütz
- Village
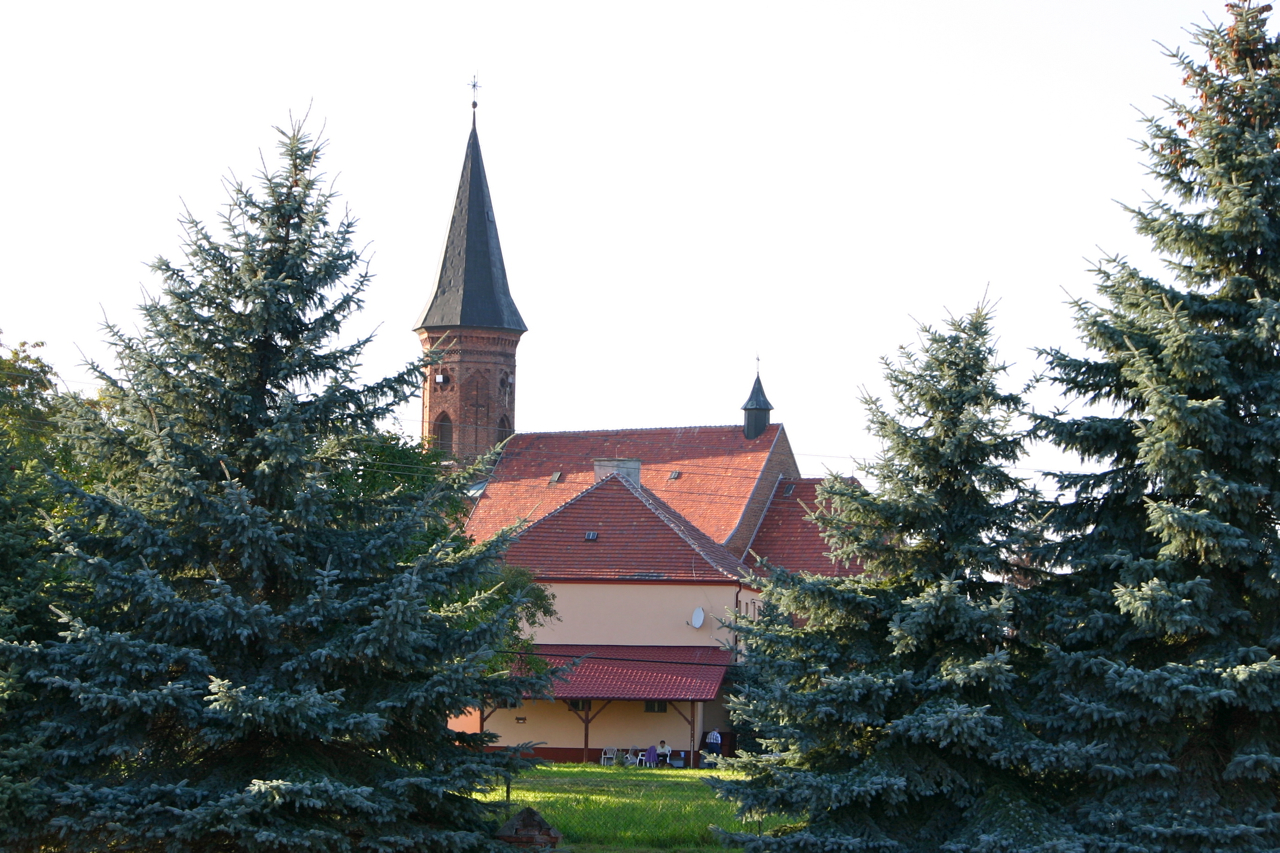
- Church of the Visitation of the Blessed Virgin Mary in Łężce

- Location within Poland
- Coordinates: 50°17′N 18°4′E
- Country: Poland
- Voivodeship: Opole
- County: Kędzierzyn-Koźle
- Gmina: Reńska Wieś
- Time zone: UTC+1 (CET)
  - Summer (DST): UTC+2 (CEST)
- Vehicle registration: OK

Łężce [ˈwɛ̃ʂt͡sɛ], additional name in German: Lenschütz, is a village in the administrative district of Gmina Reńska Wieś, within Kędzierzyn-Koźle County, Opole Voivodeship, in south-western Poland.

== History ==
In the 10th century the area became part of the emerging Polish state, and later on, it was part of Poland, Bohemia (Czechia), Prussia, and Germany. During World War II, the Germans operated the E346 forced labour subcamp of the Stalag VIII-B/344 prisoner-of-war camp at a local farm. After Germany's defeat in the war, in 1945, the village became again part of Poland.
