= Pokrzywnica, Opole Voivodeship =

Pokrzywnica Nesselwitz
- Village
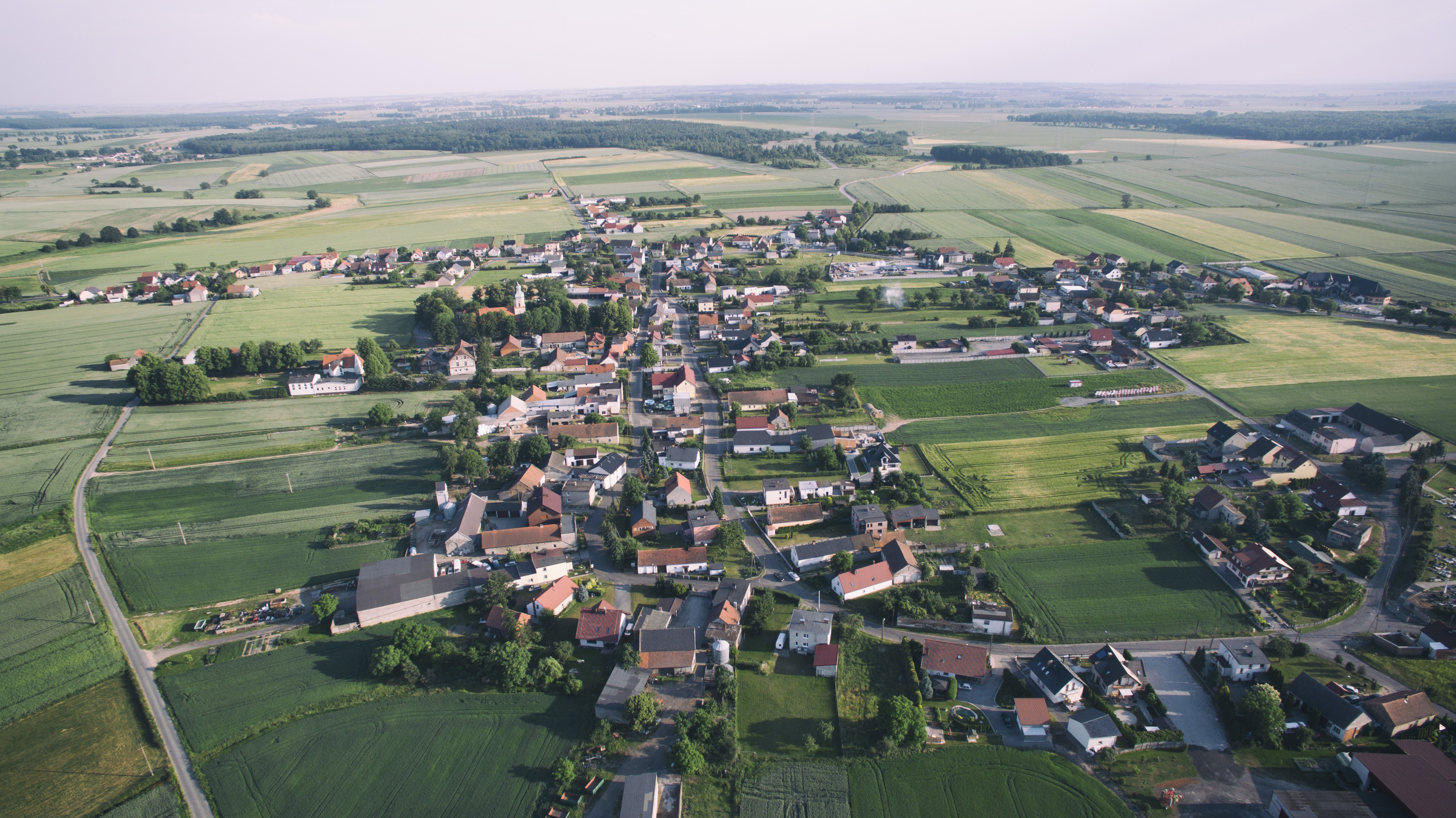

- Location within Poland
- Coordinates: 50°20′N 18°3′E
- Country: Poland
- Voivodeship: Opole
- County: Kędzierzyn-Koźle
- Gmina: Reńska Wieś

Pokrzywnica [pɔkʂɨvˈnit͡sa], additional name in German: Nesselwitz, is a village in the administrative district of Gmina Reńska Wieś, within Kędzierzyn-Koźle County, Opole Voivodeship, in south-western Poland.
