= Reńska Wieś, Kędzierzyn-Koźle County =

Reńska Wieś Reinschdorf
- Village
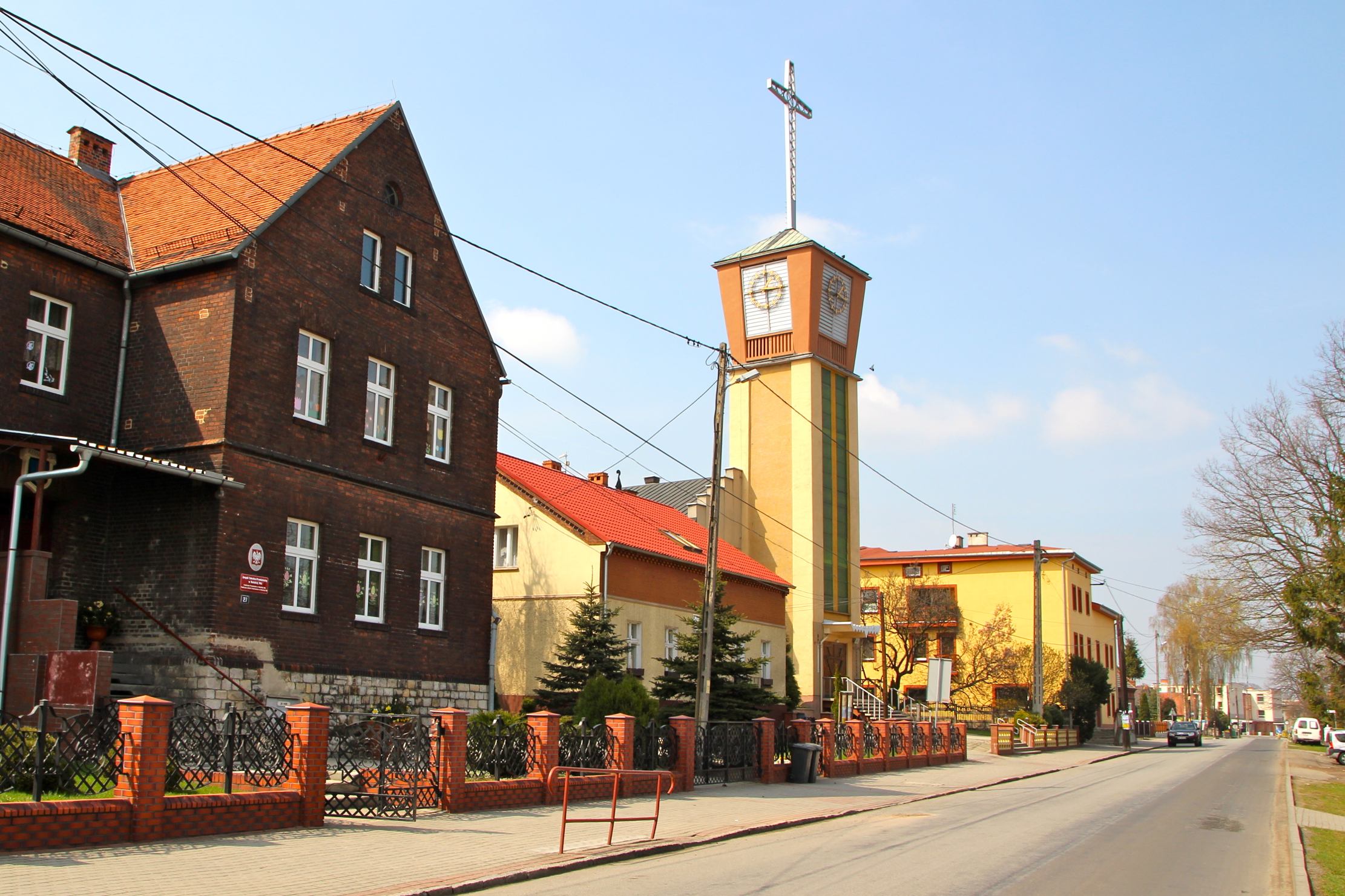

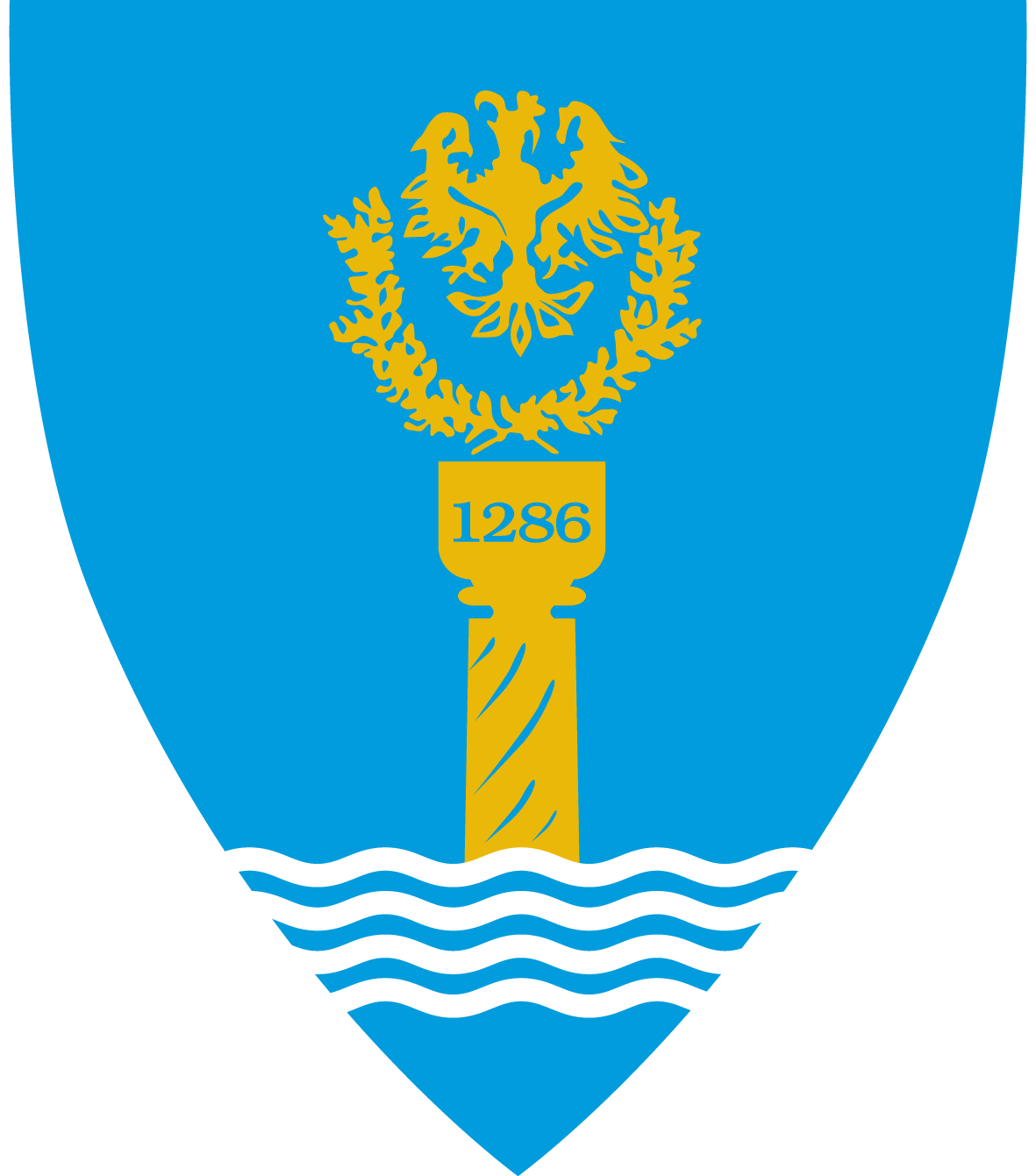
- Coat of arms

- Location within Poland
- Coordinates: 50°18′59″N 18°7′33″E
- Country: Poland
- Voivodeship: Opole
- County: Kędzierzyn-Koźle
- Gmina: Reńska Wieś
- Population: 1,800

Reńska Wieś [ˈrɛɲska ˈvjɛɕ], additional name in German: Reinschdorf, is a village in Kędzierzyn-Koźle County, Opole Voivodeship, in south-western Poland in the region of Upper Silesia. It is the seat of the gmina (administrative district) of the same name.

== History ==
The village was first mentioned in 1532 as Rinska. Since 1742, after the defeat of Austria in the First Silesian War, Reinschdorf belonged to Prussia and in 1816 it was assigned to Landkreis Cosel.

The early 19th and 20th centuries saw a revival of the town, as Reinschdorf was located on the road between Leobschütz and Cosel, which had become one of the largest inland ports in the German Empire. In 1864 a large sugar mill was built in the town, and in 1882 Reinschdorf was connected to the rail network.

Until 1928, the town was parochially administered by the parish of St. Sigismund in Cosel. Though a small neo-Gothic chapel was built in 1861, the town only received its own church in 1924–1926. The present Church of St. Urban was built in 1979–1980.

In the Upper Silesian plebiscite of 20 March 1921, 940 villagers (87.6%) voted to remain with Germany, while only 133 people voted to join the newly created state of Poland. As a result, Reinschdorf remained in Germany as part of the Weimar Republic.
