= Mechnica, Opole Voivodeship =

Mechnica Mechnitz
- Village
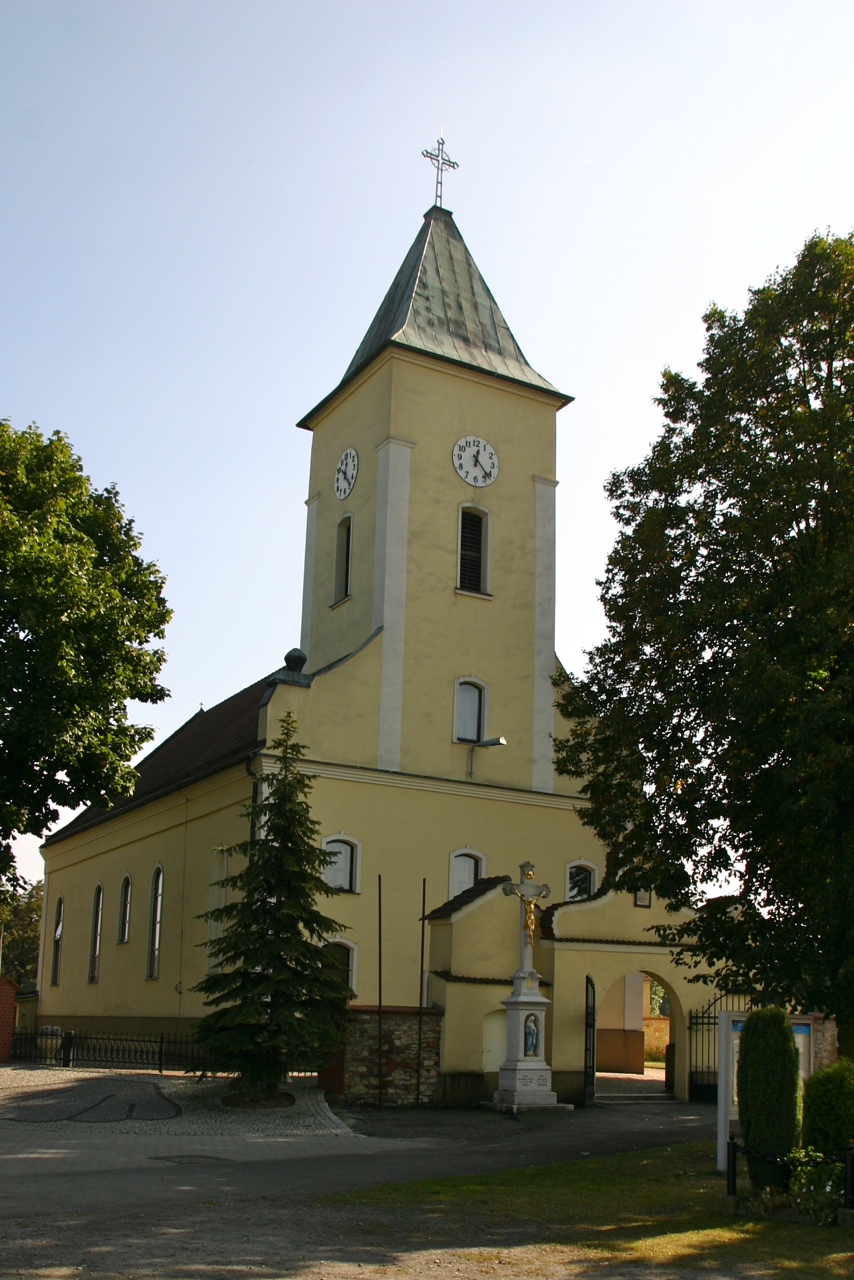
- Catholic church

- Location within Poland
- Coordinates: 50°24′N 18°3′E
- Country: Poland
- Voivodeship: Opole
- County: Kędzierzyn-Koźle
- Gmina: Reńska Wieś
- Population: 890
- Website: www.solectwo-mechnica.za.pl

Mechnica [mɛxˈnit͡sa], additional name in German: Mechnitz, is a village in the administrative district of Gmina Reńska Wieś, within Kędzierzyn-Koźle County, Opole Voivodeship, in south-western Poland.
