= Naczysławki =

Naczysławki Klein Nimsdorf
- Village
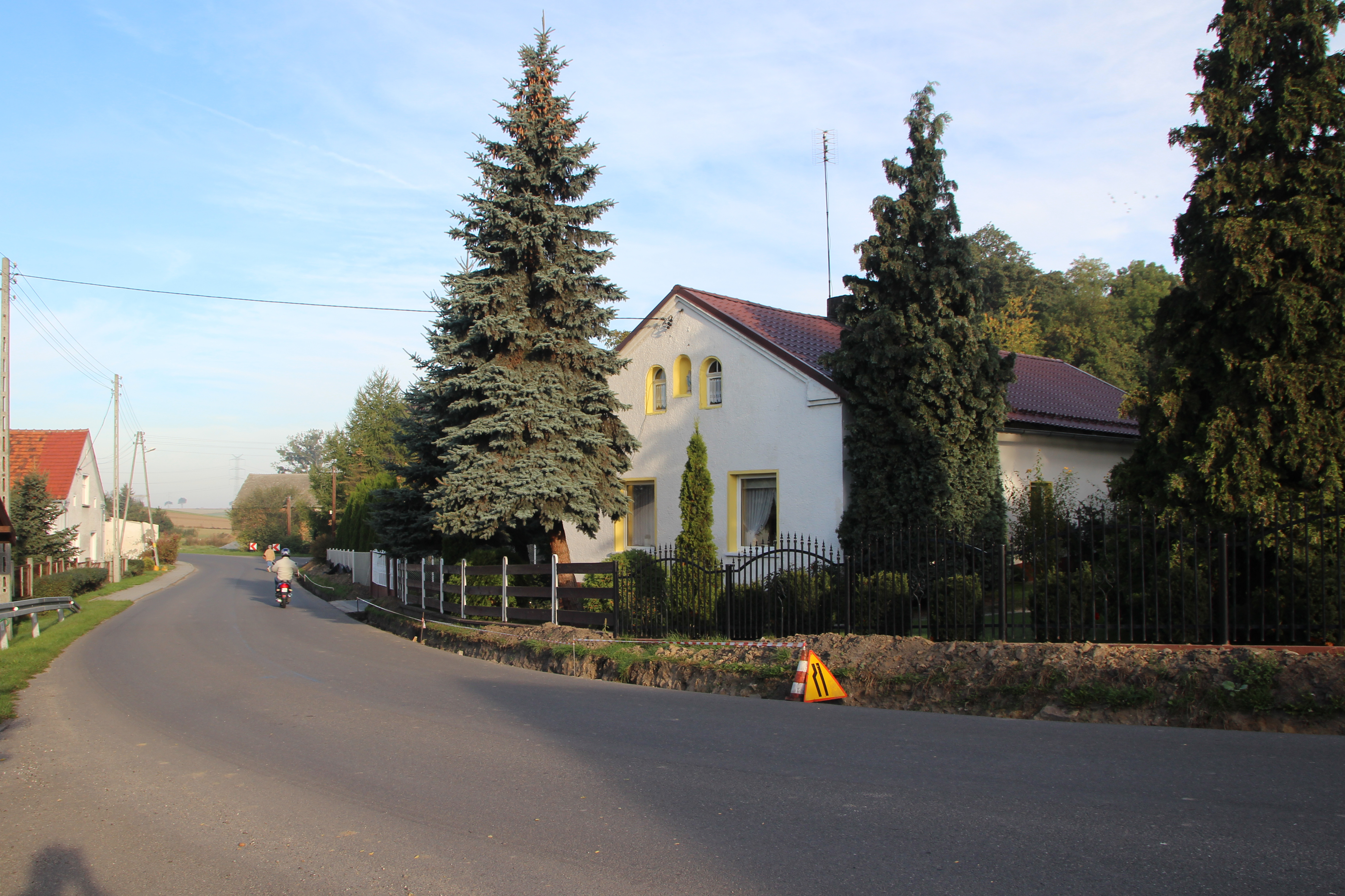

- Location within Poland
- Coordinates: 50°16′N 18°7′E
- Country: Poland
- Voivodeship: Opole
- County: Kędzierzyn-Koźle
- Gmina: Reńska Wieś

Naczysławki [nat͡ʂɨˈswafki], additional name in German: Klein Nimsdorf, is a village in the administrative district of Gmina Reńska Wieś, within Kędzierzyn-Koźle County, Opole Voivodeship, in south-western Poland.
