= Vytautas Šlapikas =

Lithuanian chess player (born 1973)

Personal information
- Born: 30 April 1973 (age 53) Ukmergė, Lithuania

Chess career
- Country: Lithuania
- Title: International Master (1999)
- Peak rating: 2448 (January 2001)

Vytautas Šlapikas (born 30 April 1973) is a Lithuanian chess player who holds the title of International Master (IM, 1999). He is the winner of Lithuanian Chess Championship (1996).

== Biography ==
In 1996, Vytautas Šlapikas won the Lithuanian Chess Championship where he shared 1st-2nd places with Virginijus Dambrauskas and ahead of him in additional indicators. In 2000, he participated in a large division of 1st place in the Lithuanian Chess Championship but, according to additional indicators, he was left without a medal.

In 2000, Vytautas Šlapikas participated in the FIDE World Chess Championship Baltic country Zonal tournament.

Vytautas Šlapikas played for Lithuania in the Chess Olympiads:

- In 2000, at the fourth board in the 34th Chess Olympiad in Istanbul (+5, =2, -3).

In 1999, he was awarded the FIDE International Master (IM) title.

Since the beginning of the 2000s, Vytautas Šlapikas has been actively participating in correspondence chess tournaments. He won a bronze medal in the Lithuanian Correspondence Chess Championship (2002–2004).

Vytautas Šlapikas is a graduate of the Aleksandras Stulginskis University (ASU) (now Vytautas Magnus University Agriculture Academy) majoring in agricultural economics. He worked at the Municipal Bureau of Culture and Education in Kaunas. Later, he worked as a chess coach and insurance consultant in the company Lietuvos draudimas.

Vytautas Šlapikas had a mental disorder. In 2013, he officially quit his last job. On January 13, 2014, while in an insane state, Vytautas Šlapikas killed his wife Asta Šlapikene. By the decision of Vilnius Regional Court, he placed on compulsory treatment in psychiatric hospital in Rokiškis.
