= Dębowa =

Dębowa (from Polish dębowy 'of oak trees') may refer to the following places:

- Dębowa, Opole Voivodeship (south-west Poland)
- Dębowa, Pomeranian Voivodeship (north Poland)
- Dębowa, Subcarpathian Voivodeship (south-east Poland)
