= Dobrovsky =

Dobrovsky (masculine), Dobrovskaya (feminine), or Dobrovskoye (neuter) may refer to:

- Dobrovsky District, a district of Lipetsk Oblast, Russia
- Dobrovský (Dobrovská), Czech last name

== See also ==
- 40440 Dobrovský, main belt asteroid
- Dąbrowski (disambiguation)
