= Dombrovskis =

Origin
- Origin: Polish
- Meaning: "oak grove"

Dombrovskis (feminine: Dombrovska) is a Latvian surname of Polish origin (from Polish surname Dąbrowski). Notable people with the surname include:

- Peter Dombrovskis (1945–1996), Australian photographer
- Valdis Dombrovskis (born 1971), Latvian politician
- Vjačeslavs Dombrovskis (born 1977), Latvian politician and economist
