= Dubrovskoye Urban Settlement =

Dubrovskoye Urban Settlement is the name of several municipal formations in Russia.

- Dubrovskoye Urban Settlement, a municipal formation corresponding to Dubrovsky Settlement Administrative Okrug, an administrative division of Dubrovsky District of Bryansk Oblast
- Dubrovskoye Urban Settlement, a municipal formation corresponding to Dubrovskoye Settlement Municipal Formation, an administrative division of Vsevolozhsky District of Leningrad Oblast

== See also ==
- Dubrovsky
