= Dubrovsky, Altai Krai =

Dubrovsky Дубровский
- Settlement
- Location within Altai Krai Location within Russia
- Coordinates: 52°39′N 82°51′E
- Country: Russia
- Region: Altai Krai
- District: Aleysky District
- Time zone: UTC+7:00

Dubrovsky (Russian: Дубровский) is a rural locality (a settlement) in Kirovsky Selsoviet, Aleysky District, Altai Krai, Russia. The population was 45 as of 2013. There are 2 streets.

== Geography ==
Dubrovsky is located 27 km north of Aleysk (the district's administrative centre) by road. Krasnodubrovsky is the nearest rural locality.
