= Novonikolsky, Altai Krai =

Novonikolsky Новоникольский
- Settlement
- Location within Altai Krai Location within Russia
- Coordinates: 52°46′N 82°49′E
- Country: Russia
- Region: Altai Krai
- District: Aleysky District
- Time zone: UTC+7:00

Novonikolsky (Russian: Новоникольский) is a rural locality (a settlement) in Kirovsky Selsoviet, Aleysky District, Altai Krai, Russia. The population was 108 as of 2013. There are 5 streets.

== Geography ==
Novonikolsky is located 45 km north of Aleysk (the district's administrative centre) by road. Kirovskoye is the nearest rural locality.
