= Długomiłowice =

Długomiłowice Langlieben
- Village
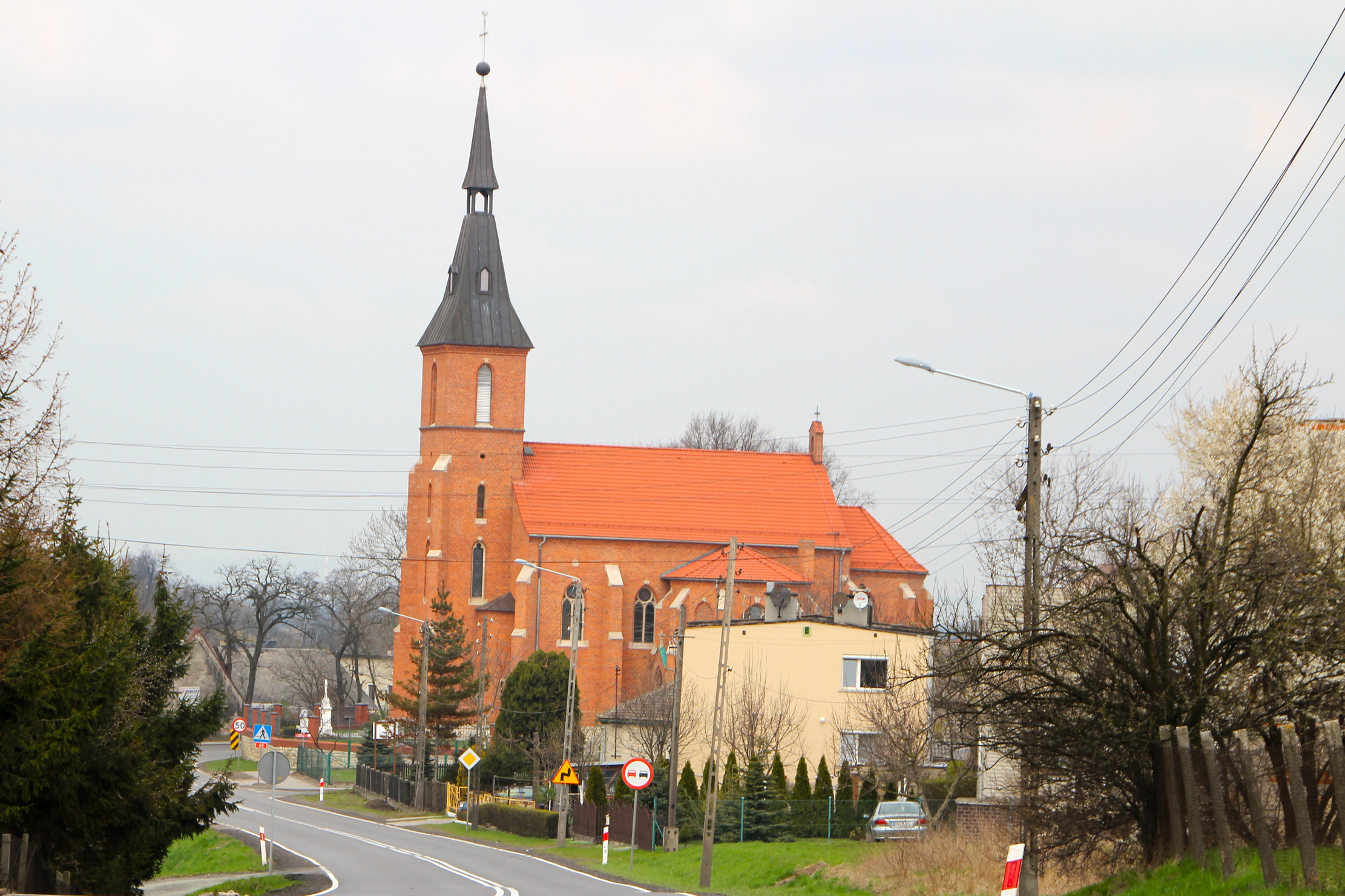

- Location within Poland
- Coordinates: 50°17′N 18°9′E
- Country: Poland
- Voivodeship: Opole
- County: Kędzierzyn-Koźle
- Gmina: Reńska Wieś
- Population: 1,600

Długomiłowice [dwuɡɔmiwɔˈvit͡sɛ], additional name in German: Langlieben, is a village in the administrative district of Gmina Reńska Wieś, within Kędzierzyn-Koźle County, Opole Voivodeship, in south-western Poland.
