= Dombrovsky =

Dombrovsky, Dombrovskiy, Russian: Домбровский, feminine: Dombrovskaya is a Russian form of the Polish surname Dąbrowski. Notable people with the surname include:

- Vadim Dombrovskiy (born 1958), Soviet swimmer
- Yury Dombrovsky (1909–1978), Russian writer
