= Gmina Reńska Wieś =

Gmina Reńska Wieś Gemeinde Reinschdorf Reńska Wieś Commune
- Gmina
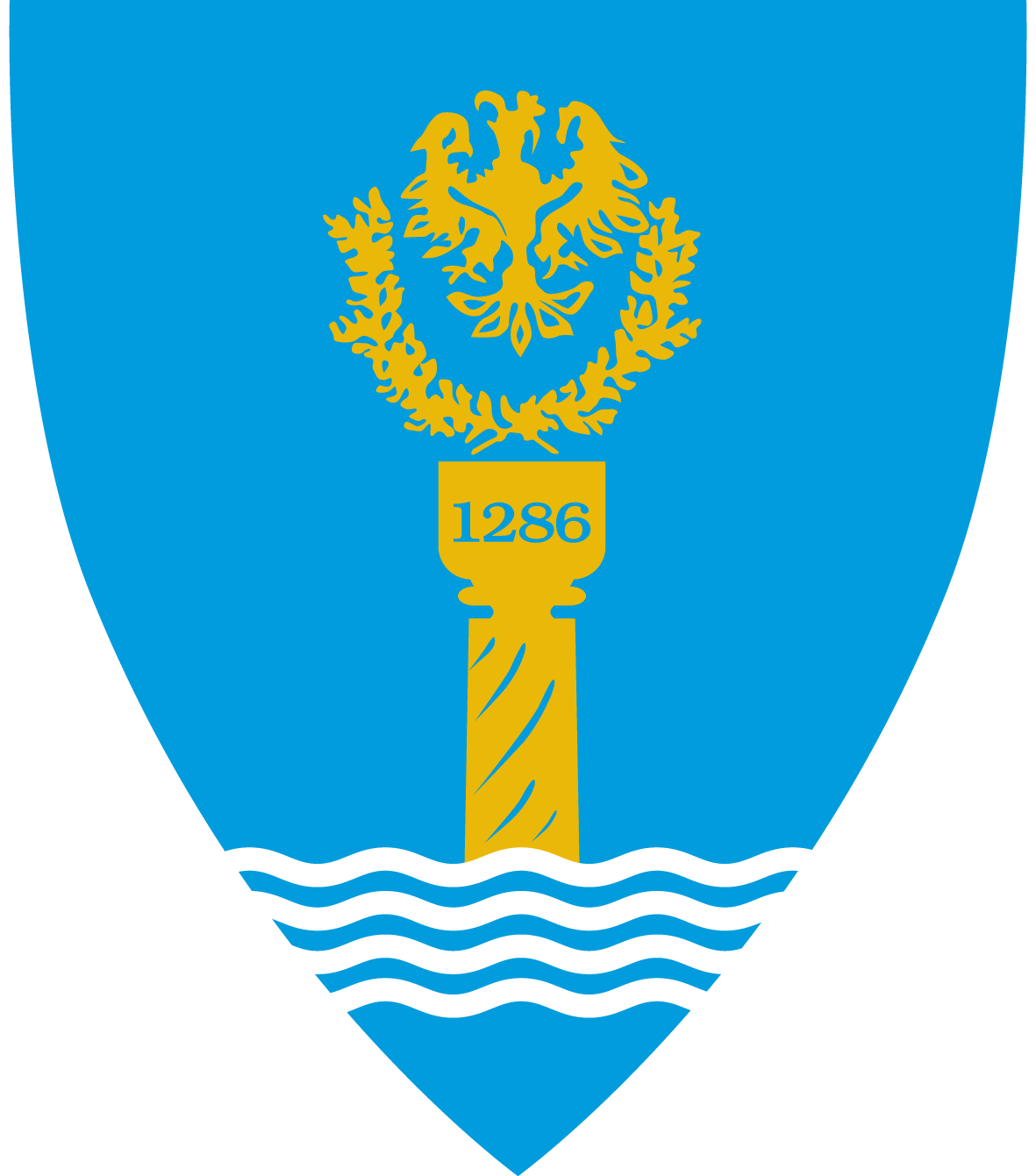
- Flag Coat of arms
- Interactive map of Gmina Reńska Wieś; Gemeinde Reinschdorf
- Coordinates (Reńska Wieś): 50°18′59″N 18°7′33″E
- Country: Poland
- Voivodeship: Opole
- County: Kędzierzyn-Koźle
- Seat: Reńska Wieś

Government
  - Mayor: Marian Wojciechowski

Area
  - Total: 97.91 km^{2} (37.80 sq mi)

Population (2019-06-30)
  - Total: 8,251
  - Density: 84.27/km^{2} (218.3/sq mi)
- Time zone: UTC+1 (CET)
  - Summer (DST): UTC+2 (CEST)
- Vehicle registration: OK
- Website: http://www.renskawies.pl

Gmina Reńska Wieś (German: Gemeinde Reinschdorf) is a rural gmina (administrative district) in Kędzierzyn-Koźle County, Opole Voivodeship, in southern Poland. Its seat is the village of Reńska Wieś, which lies approximately 7 kilometres (4 mi) south-west of Kędzierzyn-Koźle and 42 km (26 mi) south of the regional capital Opole.

The gmina covers an area of 97.91 square kilometres (37.8 sq mi), and as of 2019, its total population was 8,251. Since 2006 the commune, like much of the area, has been bilingual in Polish and German, a substantial German minority having remained behind after World War II.

== Villages ==
The commune contains the villages and settlements of:

- Reńska Wieś
- Bytków
- Dębowa
- Długomiłowice
- Gierałtowice
- Kamionka
- Komorno
- Łężce
- Mechnica
- Naczysławki
- Poborszów
- Pociękarb
- Pokrzywnica
- Radziejów
- Większyce

== Neighbouring gminas ==
Gmina Reńska Wieś is bordered by the gminas of Głogówek, Walce and Zdzieszowice.

== Twin towns – sister cities ==
Gmina Reńska Wieś is twinned with:

- Andělská Hora, Czech Republic
- Biała Piska, Poland
- Horka, Germany
- Negureni, Moldova
- Neuenstein, Germany
- Poiana Lacului, Romania
- Tarnivtsi, Ukraine
