= Kazimierz Dembowski =

Polish Jesuit publisher

Blessed Kazimierz Dembowski

Kazimierz Dembowski (3 August 1912 – 10 August 1942) was a Polish Jesuit involved in the religious publishing industry, who shortly after the German invasion of Poland was arrested by the Gestapo, imprisoned at several places of detention, and lastly deported to the Dachau concentration camp where he was murdered in a gas chamber. He is among 122 Polish martyrs whose beatification process was advanced in 2003.

== Life ==
Dembowski was born in Strzyżów in the family of Zygmunt Dembowski and his wife Marja, née Denkert. Through a special indult from the General of the Jesuits, he entered the Society at Stara Wieś on 23 November 1926 at the age of 14. At Stara Wieś he passed a two-year novitiate under the novice master Augustyn Dyla (1885–1958), a Jesuit professor of philosophy. He was subsequently educated at a Jesuit gimnazjum at Pińsk in Poland (now Pinsk in Belarus; see picture above) where he graduated in May 1932, subsequently pursuing higher studies at the Jesuit institute in Kraków (1932–1935) and at Lyon, France (1935–1939).

After his return to Poland in 1939 Dembowski worked as a translator for the religious publisher Wydawnictwo Apostolstwa Modlitwy of Kraków, the oldest Catholic publishing house in Poland (now called the Wydawnictwo WAM). He translated into Polish the text of Jean-Vincent Bainvel (1858–1937), a professor in the Institut catholique de Paris, entitled La Dévotion au Sacré-Coeur de Jésus : doctrine, histoire, which appeared in his translation in 1934 as Kult Serca Bożego: teorja i rozwój. He was also a co-editor of the monthly magazine Posłaniec Serca Jezusowego ("The Messenger of the Heart of Jesus"), a serial publication which appeared in 40 languages.

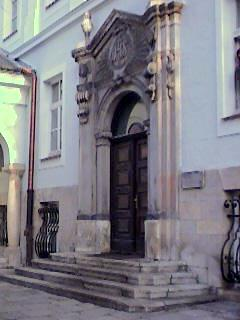
The Cracoviense Collegium Maximum SS. Cordis Iesu, place of Dembowski's arrest by the Gestapo

On 6 November 1939, just sixty-six days after the German invasion of Poland, the Gestapo carried out the so-called Sonderaktion Krakau, an operation in which virtually all of the professors of the Jagiellonian University of Kraków were arrested and imprisoned in the ulica Montelupich as part of the larger plan of Third Reich to eliminate all Polish intelligentsia. Four days later, on 10 November 1939, Dembowski was arrested by the Gestapo together with 24 other Jesuits of the Jesuit College of Kraków (the Cracoviense Collegium Maximum SS. Cordis Iesu, see picture to the right) — eight of them employees of the publishing house Wydawnictwo Apostolstwa Modlitwy — and likewise imprisoned in the ulica Montelupich. Although the Jesuits were never informed of the reasons for their arrest, it was clear that they opposed the vision of the Germans and for that reason were treated as the enemies of the Reich. During his incarceration at the Montelupich Prison, Dembowski was appointed by the rector of his Jesuit College (Wiktor Macko) to perform the functions of the chaplain to his fellow-arrestee Jesuit confrères. After 43 days of detention at Montelupich, Dembowski was transferred on 23 December 1939, together with the lay Jesuit brother, Ludwik Rzeźnikowski, to another notorious Gestapo prison at Wiśnicz, which was in reality (if not in name) a German extermination camp in which prisoners were worked to death. Despite the exhausting conditions of imprisonment exacerbated further by his tall stature and delicate health, Dembowski managed secretly to continue his ministry to his confrères and other prisoners.

On 20 June 1940, after six months (180 days) at Wiśnicz, Dembowski was deported, together with the other Jesuit prisoners, to the Auschwitz concentration camp, then in the process of being formed, where on arrival he was assigned the inmate number 770. (The number 771 was given to Franciszek Przewłoka (1912–1945), member of the religious institute of Albertine Brothers.) He was thus one of the first Auschwitz prisoners who were forced into the construction of the camp. Dembowski's stay at Auschwitz and his heroic demeanour as a witness to the Christian faith is mentioned by a fellow prisoner, Adam Kozłowiecki, the future cardinal, in his Auschwitz memoirs. In Auschwitz Dembowski was impressed into a penal company, the so-called Strafkompanie, consisting of several prisoners whose gruelling tasks included pushing an enormous road roller with which they had to level the Appellplatz (roll-call ground) under the watchful eye of the infamous Auschwitz henchman Ernst Krankemann.

On 10 December 1940 Dembowski together with the other surviving Jesuits was transferred to the Dachau concentration camp where he received inmate number 22238. He spent 20 months at Dachau before being murdered in a gas chamber on 10 August 1942, one week after his 30th birthday, after having complained of diarrhoea at the camp's revier or infirmary.

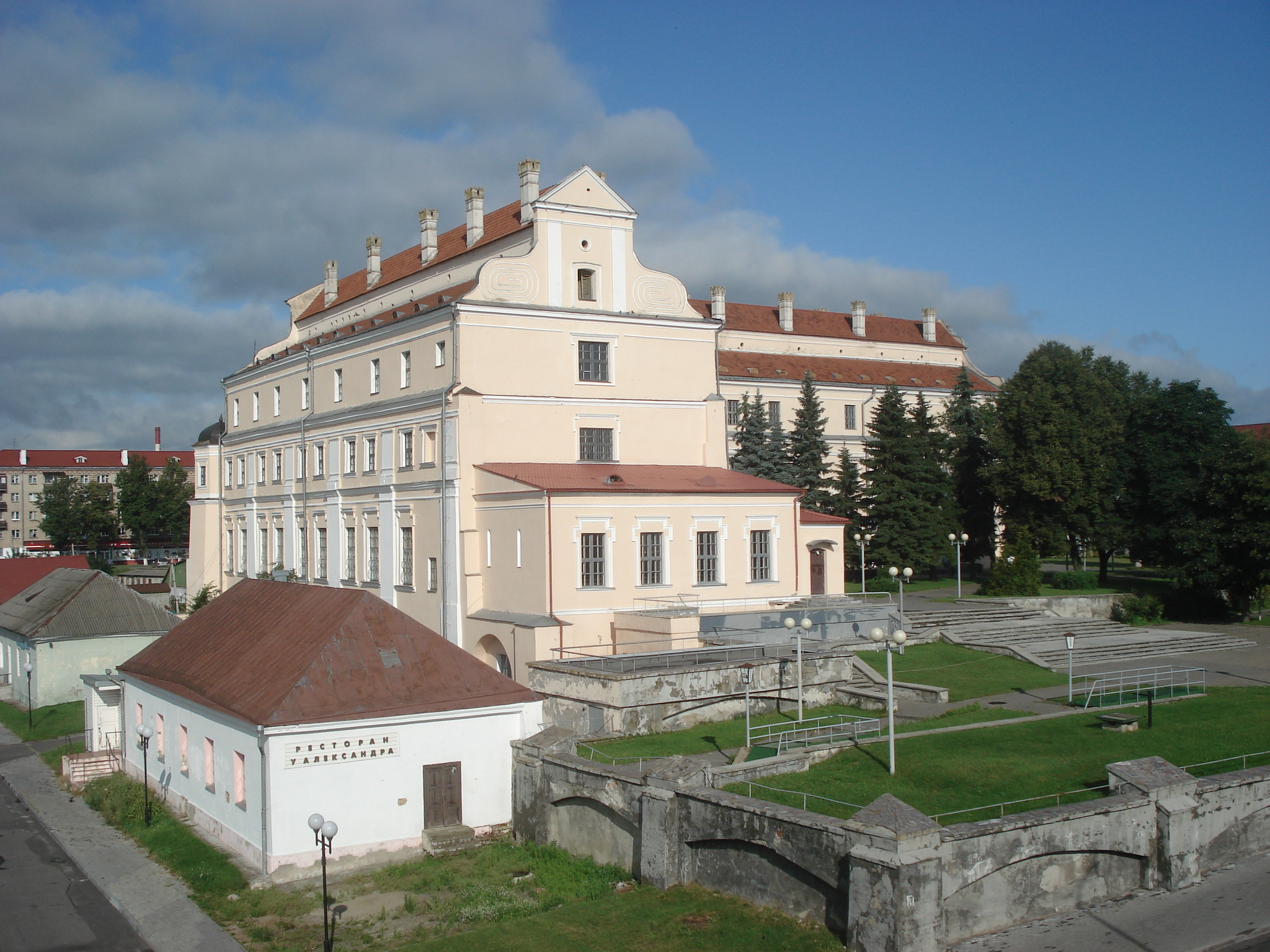
The Jesuit collegium at Pińsk, place of Dembowski's studies 1928–1932

Kazimierz Dembowski is currently one of the 122 Polish martyrs of the Second World War who are included in the beatification process initiated in 1994, whose first beatification session was held in Warsaw in 2003.

Dembowski's name is incorporated in the bronze plaque that hangs on a courtyard wall outside the Finucane Jesuit Center at Rockhurst University in Kansas City (Missouri) commemorating 152 Jesuit victims of the Germans during the Second World War.

== Bibliography ==
- Sacrum Poloniae millennium: rozprawy, szkice, materiały historyczne, vol. 11, Rome, Typis Pontificiae Universitatis Gregorianae, 1965, page 76.
- Adam Kozłowiecki, Ucisk i strapienie: pamiętnik więźnia, 1939–1945, ed. J. Humeński, Kraków, Wydawnictwo Apostolstwa Modlitwy, 1967. (Recollections of Dembowski's fellow prisoner.) Google Books
- Irena Strzelecka, "Pierwsi Polacy w KL Auschwitz", Zeszyty Oświęcimskie, vol. 18 (1983), Oświęcim, Państwowe Muzeum Auschwitz-Birkenau, 1983, page 111. ISSN 0474-8581.
- 75 lat Gimnazjum i Liceum Ogólnokształcącego w Strzyżowie, 1912–1987: księga pamiątkowa, ed. Z. Leśniak & J. Nowakowski, Strzyżów, Towarzystwo Miłośników Ziemi Strzyżowskiej; Komitet Organizacyjny Obchodów Jubileuszu 75-lecia Szkoły; Urząd Miasta i Gminy w Strzyżowie, 1987, page 54.
- Vincent A. Lapomarda, The Jesuits and the Third Reich, Lewiston (New York), Edwin Mellen Press, 1989. ISBN 0889468281.
- Encyklopedia wiedzy o jezuitach na ziemiach Polski i Litwy, 1564–1995, ed. L. Grzebień, et al., Kraków, Wydział Filozoficzny Towarzystwa Jezusowego & Instytut Kultury Religijnej: Wydawnictwo WAM, 1996, page 124. ISBN 8390500442, ISBN 8370972934.
- Kraków — Lwów: książki, czasopisma, biblioteki XIX i XX wieku, vol. 9, pt. 1, ed. H. Kosętka, et al., Kraków, Wydawnictwo Naukowe, Pedagogical University of Kraków, 2009, page 172. ISBN 9788372715531, ISBN 9788372715524.
- Stanisław Cieślak, Oblicza cierpienia i miłości: Słudzy Boży jezuici — męczennicy z II wojny światowej, Kraków, Wydawnictwo WAM, 2009. ISBN 9788375053470.

== See also ==
- 108 Martyrs of World War II
