= Komorno =

Komorno Komorno
- Village
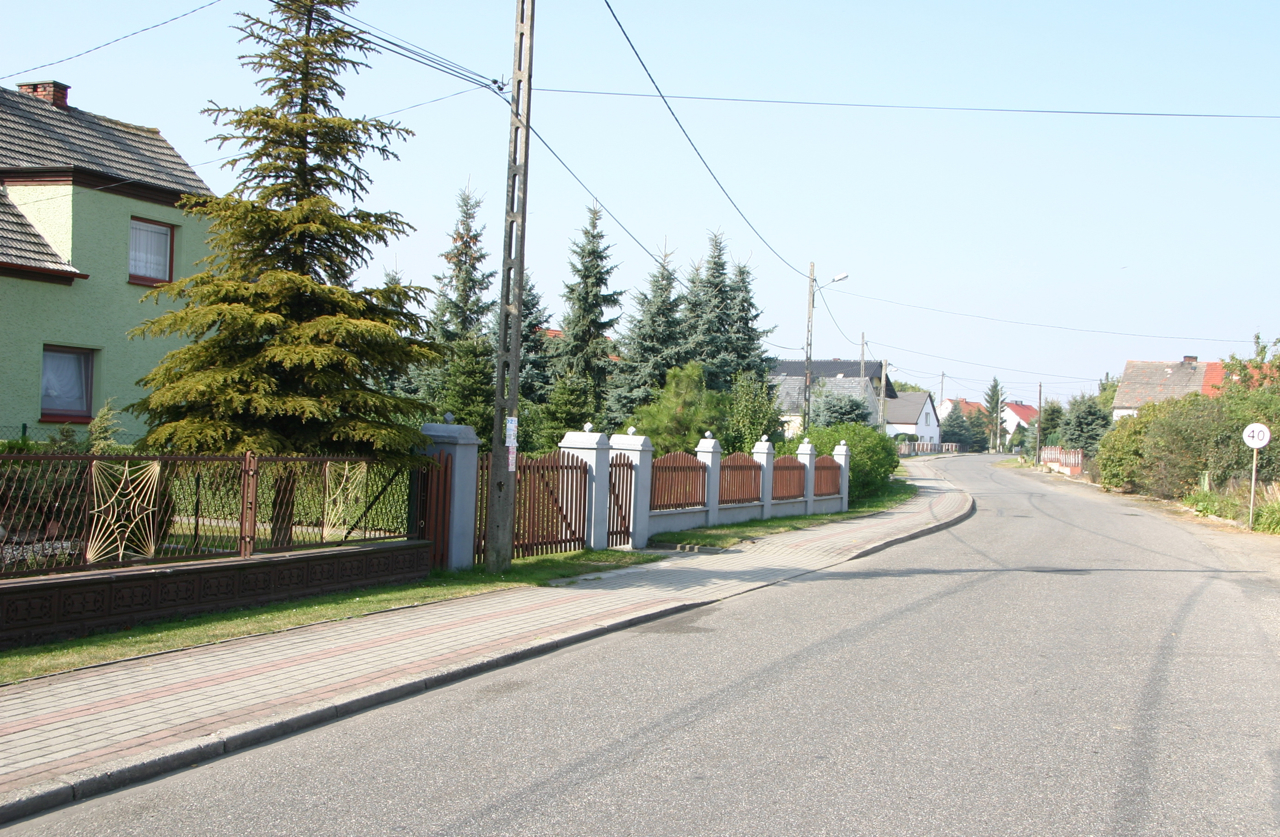

- Location within Poland
- Coordinates: 50°21′N 18°4′E
- Country: Poland
- Voivodeship: Opole
- County: Kędzierzyn-Koźle
- Gmina: Reńska Wieś

Government
  - Sołtys: Maria Gruszczyńska

Komorno [kɔˈmɔrnɔ], additional name in German: Komorno, is a village in the administrative district of Gmina Reńska Wieś, within Kędzierzyn-Koźle County, Opole Voivodeship, in south-western Poland.
