= Większyce =

Większyce Wiegschütz
- Village
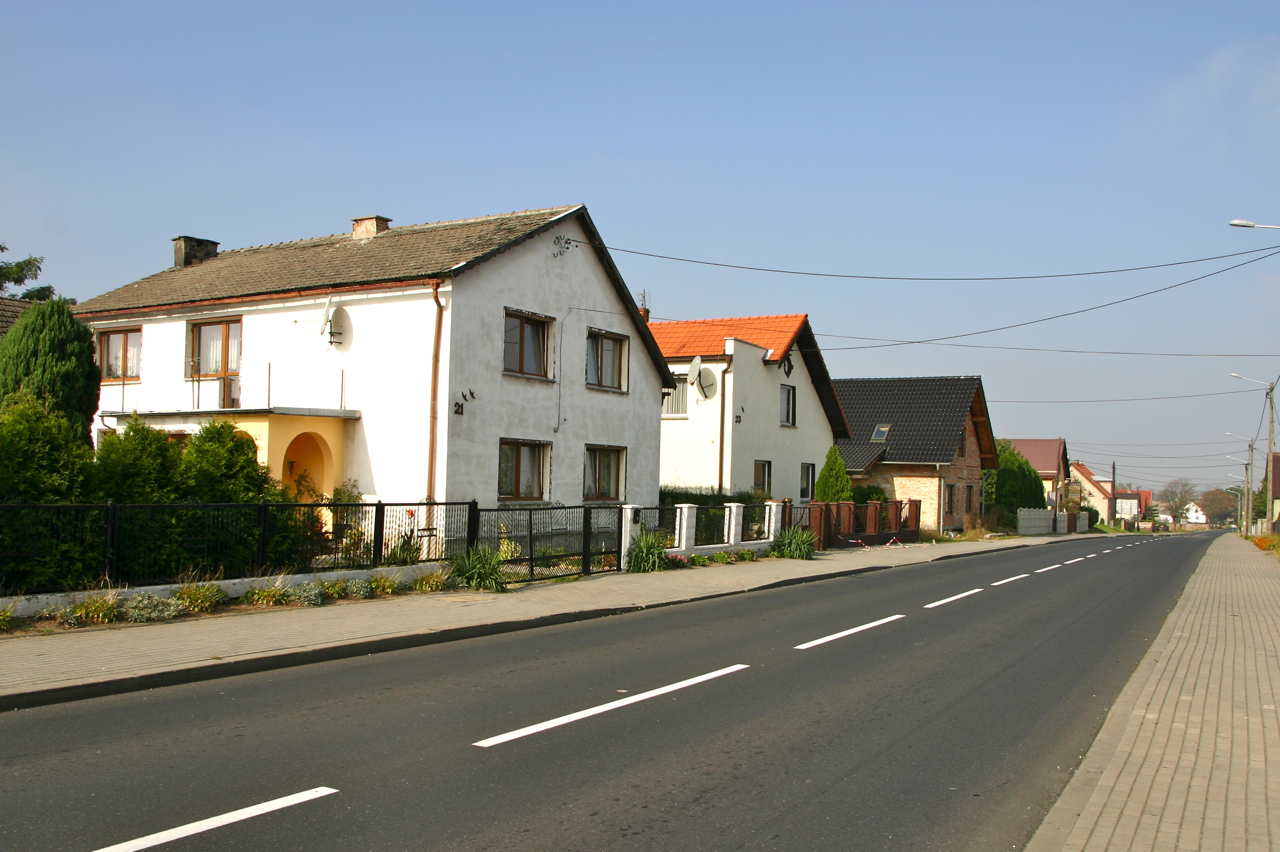

- Location within Poland
- Coordinates: 50°20′N 18°6′E
- Country: Poland
- Voivodeship: Opole
- County: Kędzierzyn-Koźle
- Gmina: Reńska Wieś

Większyce [vjɛnkˈʂɨt͡sɛ], additional name in German: Wiegschütz, is a village in the administrative district of Gmina Reńska Wieś, within Kędzierzyn-Koźle County, Opole Voivodeship, in south-western Poland. Większyce / Wiegschütz is bilingual: German and Polish. It is officially called in both languages.
