= Dembowski (crater) =

Crater on the Moon

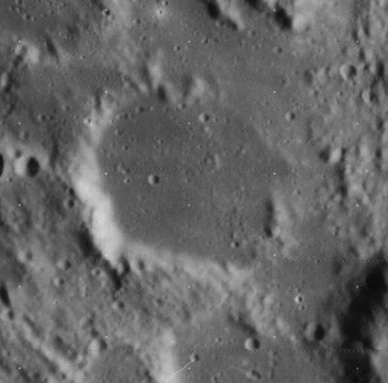
- Lunar Orbiter 4 image
- Coordinates: 2.9°N 7.2°E
- Diameter: 26.11 km (16.22 mi)
- Colongitude: 353° at sunrise
- Eponym: Ercole Dembowski

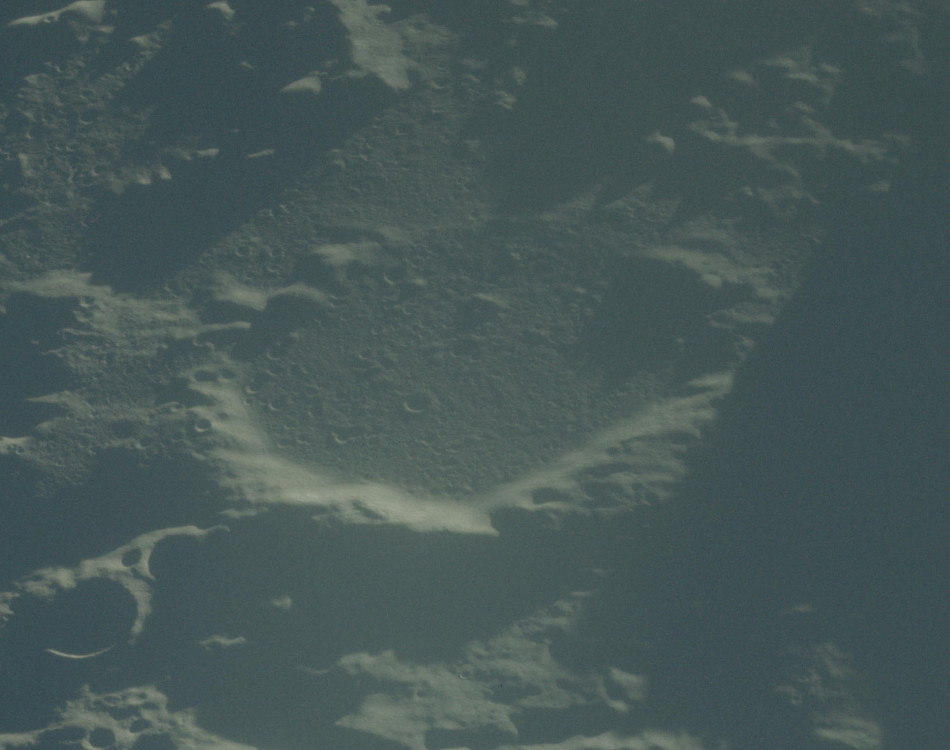
Oblique view from Apollo 10

Dembowski is an eroded lunar impact crater located to the southeast of the Sinus Medii. Its diameter is 26 km. To the east are the craters Agrippa and Godin, to the southwest is Rhaeticus.

The floor of Dembowski is covered by lava flow that has eradicated the eastern half of the rim, leaving only a slight rise in the surface where the outer wall once lay. The surviving western half of the rim is polygonal in shape, and the ends are broken; forming rises in the surface. The flow of basaltic lava appears to have reached the crater through an irregular channel running in a southern direction from the Sinus Medii.

This formation its named after Italian astronomer Ercole Dembowski (1815-1881). His name was included in the lunar nomenclature of Johann N. Krieger and Rudolf König that was published in 1912. Its designation was officially adopted by the International Astronomical Union in 1935.

== Satellite craters ==
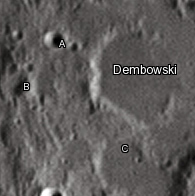
Dembowski crater and its satellite craters as seen from Earth

By convention these features are identified on lunar maps by placing the letter on the side of the crater midpoint that is closest to Dembowski.

Dembowski	Latitude	Longitude	Diameter
A	3.0° N	6.5° E	6 km
B	2.5° N	6.2° E	7 km
C	2.1° N	7.4° E	16 km
