= R-type asteroid =

Type of asteroid

R-type asteroids are moderately bright, relatively uncommon inner-belt asteroids that are spectrally intermediate between the V and A-type asteroids. The spectrum shows distinct olivine and pyroxene features at 1 and 2 micrometres, with a possibility of plagioclase. Shortwards of 0.7 μm the spectrum is very reddish.

The IRAS mission has classified 4 Vesta, 246 Asporina, 349 Dembowska, 571 Dulcinea and 937 Bethgea as type R; however, the re-classification of Vesta, the V archetype, is debatable. Of these bodies, only 349 Dembowska is recognized as being type R when all wavelengths are taken into account.

== List ==
As of February 2019, at least 5 asteroids have been classified as R-type:

Designation	Class	Diam.	Refs
349 Dembowska	main-belt	139.77 km	MPC · JPL
1904 Massevitch	main-belt	13.503 km	MPC · JPL
2371 Dimitrov	main-belt	7.465 km	MPC · JPL
5111 Jacliff	main-belt	6.447 km	MPC · JPL
(257838) 2000 JQ66	Amor	0.78 km	MPC · JPL
Diameter: averaged estimates only; may change over time

== See also ==
- Asteroid spectral types
