= Dąbrowski (disambiguation) =

Dąbrowski or Dabrowski may refer to:

- Dąbrowski, Polish surname (see that page for a list of people with that surname)
- Dabrowski Battalion (1936–1938), later Dąbrowski's International Brigade, part of the International Brigades in the Spanish Civil War
- Dąbrowa County (powiat dąbrowski), a Polish administrative area

== See also ==
- Dąbrowski's Mazurka, or "Poland Is Not Yet Lost", the Polish national anthem
- Dembowski (disambiguation)
- Dobrovsky (disambiguation)
- Dubrovsky (disambiguation)
