= Alla Masevich =

Soviet astronomer

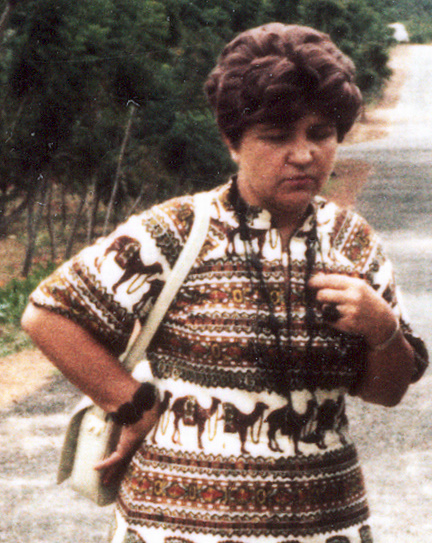
- Born: Alla Genrikhovna Masevich; October 9, 1918; Tiflis, Democratic Republic of Georgia
- Died: May 6, 2008 (aged 89); Moscow, Russia
- Education: Gosudarstvennom Astronomuheskom Institut
- Scientific career
- Fields: Astronomy

Alla Genrikhovna Masevich (Russian: Алла Генриховна Масевич; 9 October 1918 — 6 May 2008) was a Soviet and Russian astronomer. She graduated from Moscow State Pedagogical University. She served as deputy chairman of the Astronomical Council of the Academy of Sciences of the Soviet Union in 1952, and worked closely with Viktor Ambartsumian. She became a professor of space geodesy at the Moscow Institute of Geodesy and Cartography in 1972.

She is known for her work in organizing groups to observe some of the first Russian satellites (1956–57). Masevich was the Russian delegate to the International Astronautical Federation Congress following the 1957 Sputnik launch and presented a paper on optical tracking of satellites.

== Early life ==
She was born in Tiflis as the eldest child of Natalia Zhgenti, a Georgian nurse, and Genrikh Masevich, a lawyer. As a child, the popular scientific works of Yakov Perlman, whom Masevich began a correspondence with, inspired her interest in science. She earned a degree in physics from the Moscow Industrial Pedagogical Institute at Moscow University in 1940.

== Career ==
Masevich left Moscow University and moved to Kuibyshev, where she worked at the Institute of Physics and taught astronomy at Kuibyshev Teacher's College. She enrolled in the Sternberg State Astronomy Institute in 1942 for her doctoral studies. She completed her candidate's degree in 1946 and became an assistant professor of astrophysics at Moscow University. She became a full professor in 1948.

From 1952 to 1987 she held the prestigious position of Deputy Chairman of the Astronomical Council of the Academy of Sciences of the Soviet Union. During her tenure at the Academy, she led a team in 1957 to monitor Soviet satellites which included Sputnik. Her other positions included chair working group for the Committee on Space Research of International Council of Scientific Unions, president of the satellite tracking section of Geodesy, and deputy secretary general of the United Nations Conference on the Exploration and Peaceful Uses of Outer Space.

In 1961 she visited London and, with Sir Patrick Moore, gave a talk at the Royal Festival Hall.

In 1987 she left the Academy to become Chairman of the Astrosoviets, the Astronomical Council of the Academy of Sciences of the Soviet Union.

Over the course of her career, Masevich published 147 papers, three books on stellar astronomy, one book on satellite geodesy, and popular astronomy books.

== Personal life ==
In 1941, Masevich married Iosif Friedlander, an engineer whom she had met in a bomb shelter. They had one daughter together, Natasha Friedlander.

== Awards and honors ==
- Galaber Medal of the International Astronautic Federation
- Foreign member of the Royal Astronomical Society in 1963.
- Member of the International Academy of Astronautics in 1964.
- USSR State Prize (1975)

== Sources ==
- Karl Ledersteger, in Astronomische und Physikalische Geodäsie (Erdmessung). Band V von Jordan-Eggert-Kneissl, Handbuch der Vermessungskunde. Verlag J. B. Metzler, Stuttgart 1969, DNB 456892842.
- A.G.Massewitsch (1957): Aufbau und Evolution der Unterriesen
- JPL-Datenbank: Asteroid 1904 Massevitch (1972 JM)
