= Bytków, Opole Voivodeship =

Bytków Pickau
- Village
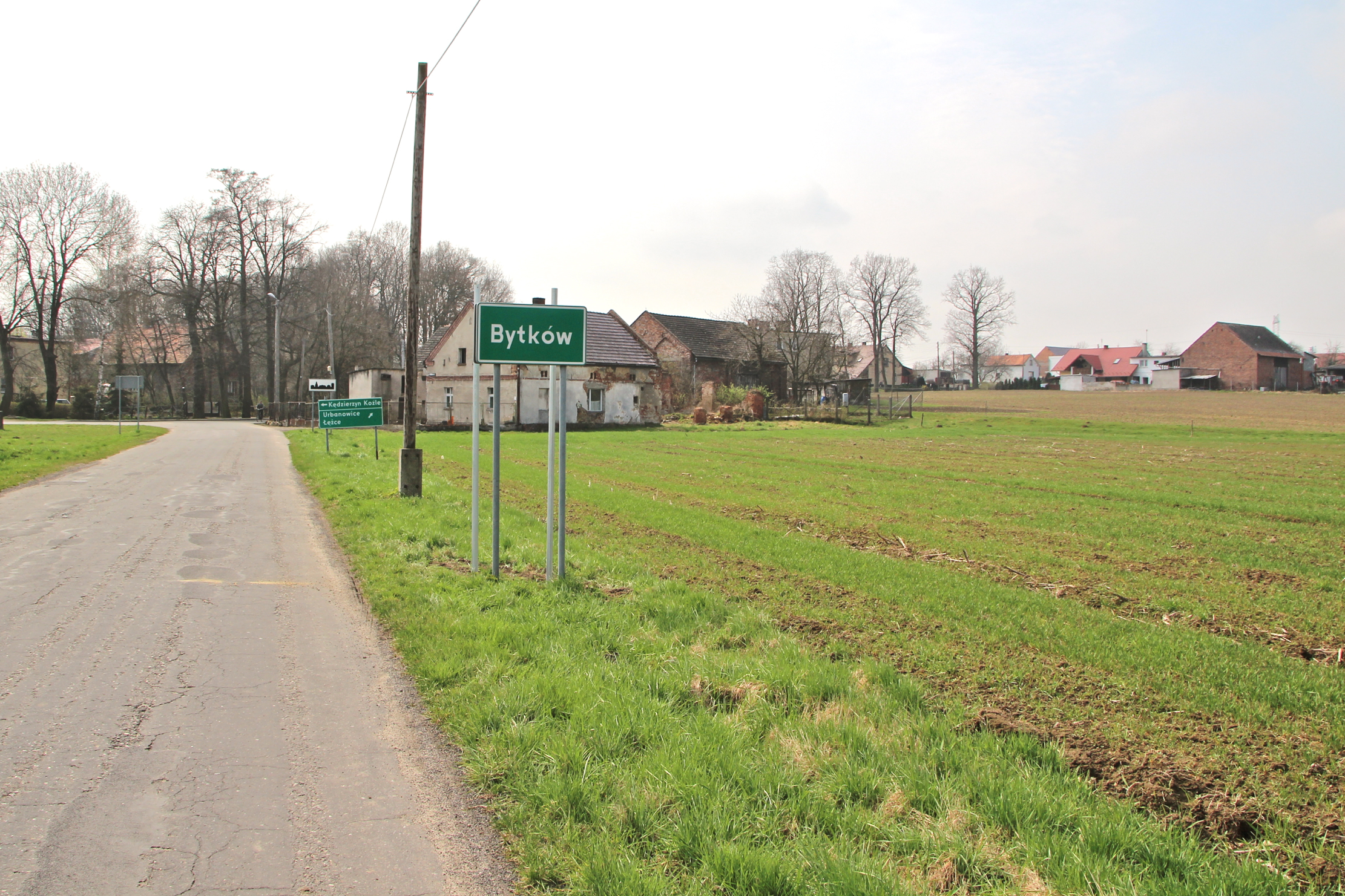

- Location within Poland
- Coordinates: 50°18′N 18°5′E
- Country: Poland
- Voivodeship: Opole
- County: Kędzierzyn-Koźle
- Gmina: Reńska Wieś

Bytków [ˈbɨtkuf], additional name in German: Pickau, is a village in the administrative district of Gmina Reńska Wieś, within Kędzierzyn-Koźle County, Opole Voivodeship, in south-western Poland.
