= 349 Dembowska =

Main-belt asteroid

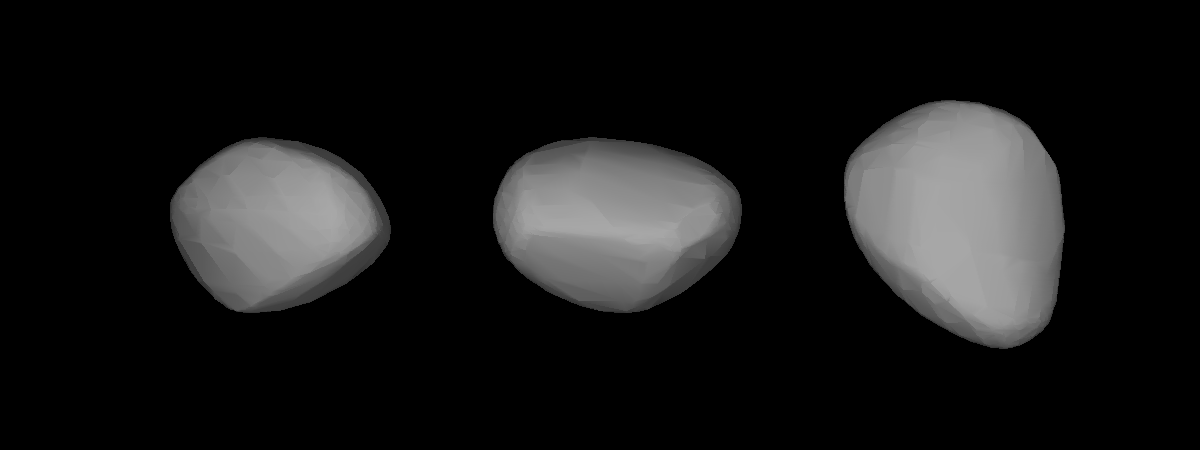
- A three-dimensional model of 349 Dembowska based on its lightcurve

Discovery
- Discovered by: Auguste Charlois
- Discovery date: 9 December 1892

Designations
- Pronunciation: /dɛmˈbaʊskə/
- Named after: Ercole Dembowski
- Alternative designations: 1892 T
- Minor planet category: Main belt

Orbital characteristics
- Epoch 31 July 2016 (JD 2457600.5)
- Uncertainty parameter 0
- Observation arc: 123.32 yr (45044 d)
- Aphelion: 3.1912 AU (477.40 Gm)
- Perihelion: 2.65635 AU (397.384 Gm)
- Semi-major axis: 2.92379 AU (437.393 Gm)
- Eccentricity: 0.091473
- Orbital period (sidereal): 5.00 yr (1826.1 d)
- Mean anomaly: 306.898°
- Mean motion: 0° 11^{m} 49.704^{s} / day
- Inclination: 8.2461°
- Longitude of ascending node: 32.351°
- Argument of perihelion: 346.225°

Physical characteristics
- Mean diameter: 155.8+5.0 −3.0 km 162 ± 17 km
- Mass: (5.26±0.25)×10^{18} kg (Note: Calculated from its standard gravitational parameter GM = 0.351±0.017 km^{3}/s^{2}.) (4.1±0.4)×10^{18} kg
- Mean density: 1.84–2.66 g/cm^{3} (calculated)
- Synodic rotation period: 4.701 h (0.1959 d); 4.701207 ± 0.000058 h
- Pole ecliptic longitude: 322°
- Pole ecliptic latitude: 18°
- Geometric albedo: 0.309+0.012 −0.019; 0.3840±0.025
- Temperature: 40–220 K
- Spectral type: R
- Absolute magnitude (H): 5.97; 5.93

349 Dembowska is a large asteroid of the main belt, discovered on 9 December 1892, by the French astronomer Auguste Charlois while working at the observatory in Nice, France. It is named in honor of the Baron Hercules Dembowski, an Italian astronomer who made significant contributions to research on double and multiple stars.

Orbiting just inside the prominent 7:3 resonance with Jupiter, 349 Dembowska is among the largest asteroids in the main belt with an estimated diameter of ~140 km. It has a rotational period of 4.7012 hours, and is classified as an R-type asteroid for the presence of strong absorption lines in olivine and pyroxene with little or no metals. It may have undergone partial melting/differentiation. 349 Dembowska has an unusually high albedo of 0.384. Of the asteroids with a diameter greater than 75 km, only 4 Vesta has a higher known albedo.

Dembowska and 16 Psyche have orbits that repeat themselves almost exactly every five years in respect to their position to the Sun and Earth.

In 1988 a search for satellites or dust orbiting this asteroid was performed using the UH88 telescope at the Mauna Kea Observatories, but the effort came up empty. There was one occultation on 31 October 2006, and on 5 December 2007.
