= Kirovskoye, Altai Krai =

Kirovskoye Кировское
- Selo
- Location within Altai Krai Location within Russia
- Coordinates: 52°43′N 82°43′E
- Country: Russia
- Region: Altai Krai
- District: Aleysky District
- Time zone: UTC+7:00

Kirovskoye (Russian: Кировское) is a rural locality (a selo) and the administrative center of Kirovsky Selsoviet, Aleysky District, Altai Krai, Russia. The population was 482 as of 2013. There are 13 streets.

== Geography ==
Kirovskoye is located 37 km north of Aleysk (the district's administrative centre) by road. Krasnodubrovsky is the nearest rural locality.
