= Krasnodubrovsky =

Krasnodubrovsky Краснодубровский
- Settlement
- Location within Altai Krai Location within Russia
- Coordinates: 52°41′N 82°45′E
- Country: Russia
- Region: Altai Krai
- District: Aleysky District
- Time zone: UTC+7:00

Krasnodubrovsky (Russian: Краснодубровский) is a rural locality (a settlement) in Kirovsky Selsoviet, Aleysky District, Altai Krai, Russia. The population was 158 as of 2013. There are 6 streets.

== Geography ==
Krasnodubrovsky is located 32 km north of Aleysk (the district's administrative centre) by road. Kirovskoye is the nearest rural locality.
