= Karl von Dombrowski =

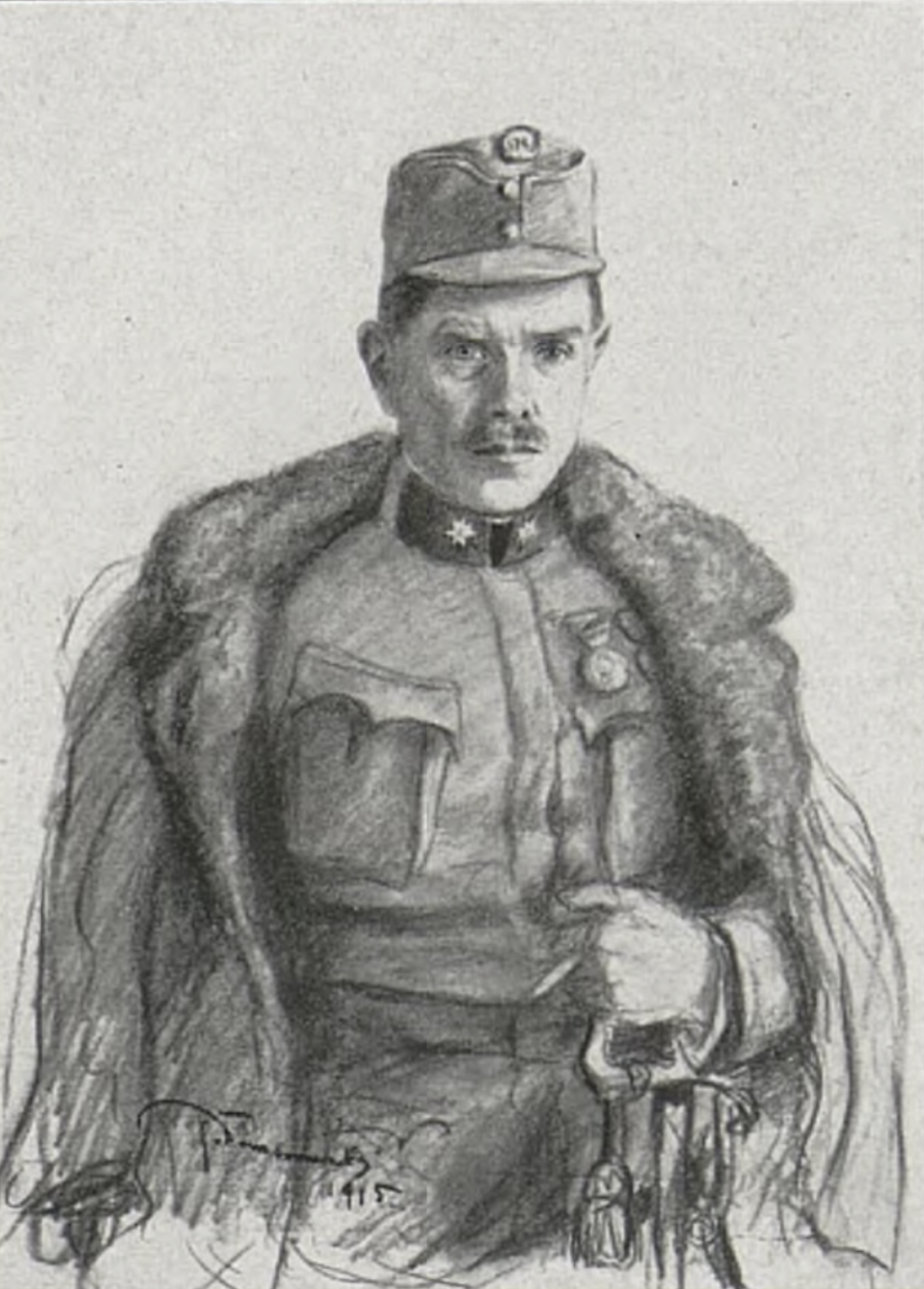
Karl von Dombrowski (self-portrait, 1915)

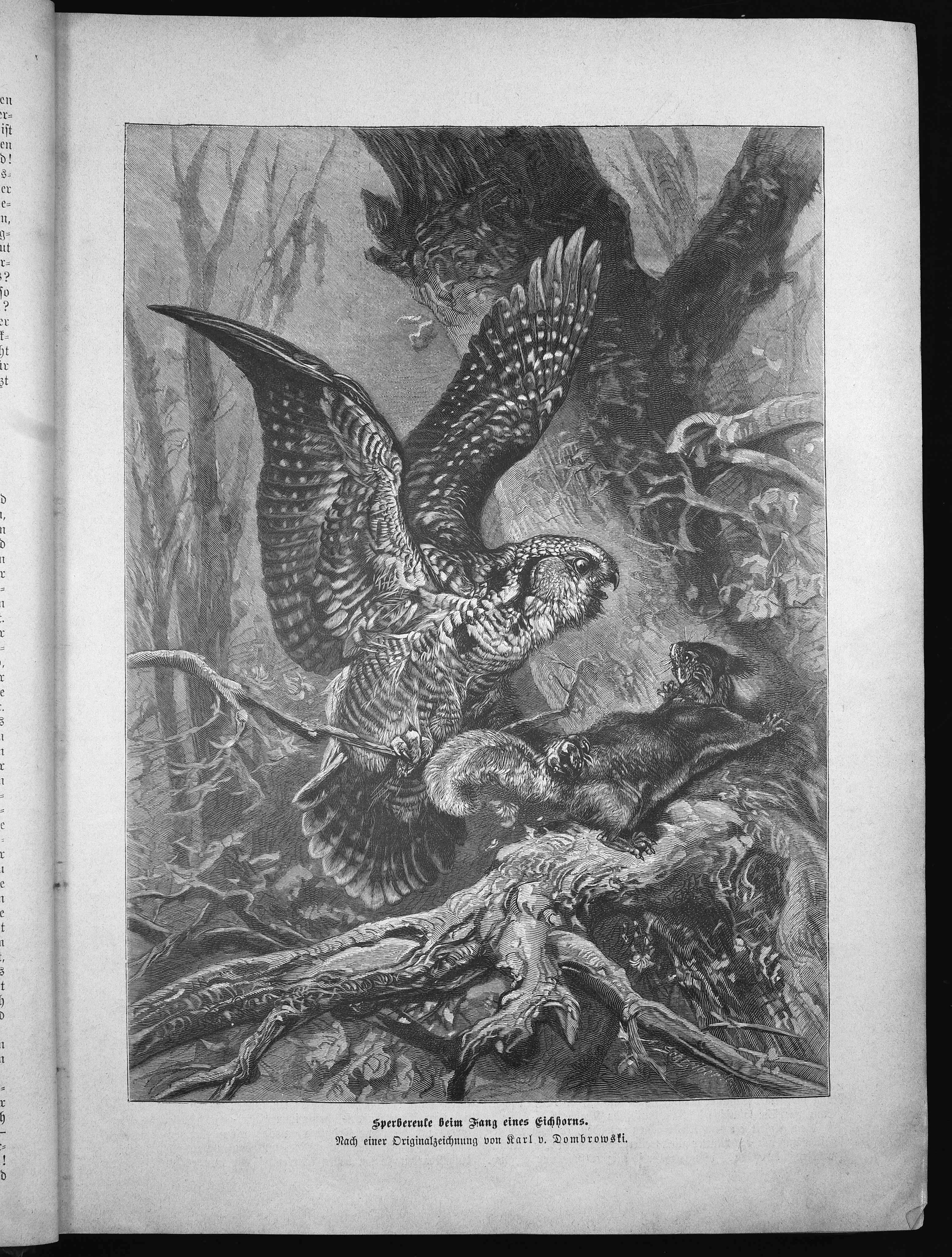
Hawk owl catching a squirrel

Karl Ritter von Dombrowski (also known as Carl von Dombrowski; January 16, 1872 at Ullitz Castle (Úlice) in Bohemia – 1951 at Obermenzing) was a German animal and hunting painter.

Karl von Dombrowski was the son of the landowner Raoul von Dombrowski zu Paprosz and Kruszwice (1833-1896), who also wrote stories from the hunters' milieu.

Dombrowski studied at the art academies in Vienna and Munich and had been based in Munich since 1919. His works appeared, among other things, as woodcut reproductions in Die Gartenlaube. From 1938 to 1943, with the exception of 1942, he was represented with seven paintings at all major German art exhibitions in Munich. In 1938, Nazi leader Hermann Esser acquired the oil painting Eichwild in East Prussia for 3,500 RM.

Karl Ritter von Dombrowski was married to Käthe Olshausen-Schönberger in her second marriage. He was brother of Ernst Ritter von Dombrowski (1862-1917) and Robert Ritter von Dombrowski (1869-1932).

== Works ==
- Munich picture sheet 47, 1894, no. 1110 "Wanderings of the animals" (illustrated by Carl von Dombrowski, 1892)
- From the High Weidwerk. Instructions for stalking large game in a manner appropriate to grazing. Shown based on personal experience. With 23 text illustrations and 13 plates. Berlin: P Parey, 1925
- Quartet "Animals". J. W. Spear & Sons, Nuremberg 1934
