= Ernst Krankemann =

German criminal

Ernst Krankemann (19 December 1895 – 28 July 1941) was an infamous Kapo in Auschwitz concentration camp.

A German common criminal, he was transferred into Auschwitz on 29 August 1940, after being sentenced to life imprisonment on a murder conviction. Although generally disliked amongst the Schutzstaffel guards, Krankemann had powerful supporters such as Karl Fritzsch, the camp's lagerführer and second-in-charge to commandant Rudolf Hoess.

As a Kapo, Krankemann held great power over other inmates of Auschwitz, including the authority to murder. One infamous incident involved Krankemann ordering other inmates to pull a very heavy roller over a collapsed inmate, killing him. About February 1941, it was reported he 'enjoyed strangling and kicking prisoners until they died', including inmates who were ill or with a disability.

On 28 July 1941, as part of the newly-extended adult euthanasia Action 14f13, Krankemann was chosen along with 572 other inmates to be taken by train to the Sonnenstein Euthanasia Clinic, a converted mental hospital, near Dresden. These were the first Auschwitz inmates to be gassed, although they were not gassed at Auschwitz itself. It has been claimed Krankemann was lynched before reaching the mental hospital.
