= Virginijus Dambrauskas =

Lithuanian chess player (born 1962)

Personal information
- Born: 23 April 1962 (age 64) Panevėžys District Municipality, Lithuania

Chess career
- Country: Lithuania
- Title: International Master (1995); International Correspondence Chess Grandmaster (2018)
- Peak rating: 2395 (January 1993)

Virginijus Dambrauskas (born 23 April 1962) is a Lithuanian chess player who holds the title of International Master (IM) and International Correspondence Chess Grandmaster (GM, 2018). He is winner of Lithuanian Chess Championship (1992).

== Biography ==
Virginijus Dambrauskas was a multiple participant of the Lithuanian Chess Championships, in which he won two medals: gold (1992) and silver (1996, shared 1st-2nd places with Vytautas Šlapikas and behind of him in additional indicators).

Virginijus Dambrauskas played for Lithuania in the Chess Olympiad:

- In 1992, at reserve board in the 30th Chess Olympiad in Manila (+0, =2, -1).

Virginijus Dambrauskas played for Lithuania in the European Team Chess Championship:

- In 1992, at reserve board in the 10th European Team Chess Championship in Debrecen (+0, =0, -1).

Virginijus Dambrauskas also five times played for Lithuanian chess clubs in European Chess Club Cups (1996, 2006–2009). He was awarded the FIDE International Master (IM) title.

Since 1978, Virginijus Dambrauskas has been active participated in correspondence chess tournaments. His main achievements are two silver medals of the 5th and 6th European Team Correspondence Chess Championships as part of the Lithuanian team (competitions were held from 1999 to 2004 and from 2004 to 2008). In 2018, he was awarded the ICCF International Correspondence Chess Grandmaster (GM) title. He is the Vice President of the Lithuanian Correspondence Chess Federation.

Virginijus Dambrauskas is in the civil service as a senior inspector of the Information Systems Center of the Customs Department of the Ministry of Finance of Lithuania.
