= Ercole Dembowski =

Italian astronomer (1812–1881)

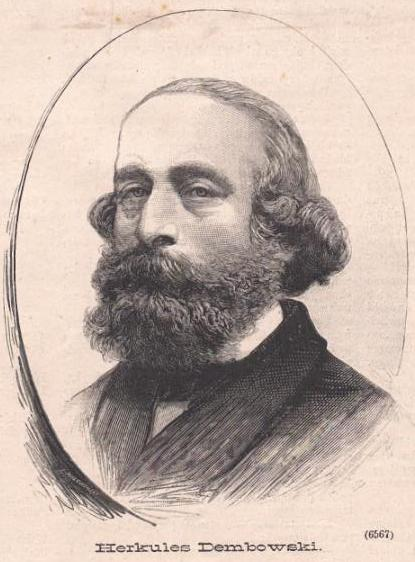
Herkules Dembowski

Ercole (Hercules) Dembowski (12 January 1812 – 19 January 1881) was an Italian astronomer.

== Biography ==
Dembowski was born in Milan. He inherited the title of "Baron" as the son of Jan Dembowski (Dębowski), one of Napoleon's Polish generals. He served in the navy of Austria-Hungary until 1843 when he retired for health reasons to Naples.

He was a tireless observer of double stars and made tens of thousands of micrometer measurements. In particular, he remeasured many double stars from Friedrich Struve's Dorpat Catalogue, noting how some of them had changed position over the years due to their mutual orbit as binary stars.

He won the Gold Medal of the Royal Astronomical Society in 1878.

The crater Dembowski on the Moon is named after him, as well as the main belt asteroid 349 Dembowska.
