= Dubrovsky, Uryupinsky District, Volgograd Oblast =

Dubrovsky Дубровский
- Khutor
- Location within Volgograd Oblast Location within Russia
- Coordinates: 50°46′N 41°31′E
- Country: Russia
- Region: Volgograd Oblast
- District: Uryupinsky District
- Time zone: UTC+4:00

Dubrovsky (Russian: Дубровский) is a rural locality (a khutor) in Iskrinskoye Rural Settlement, Uryupinsky District, Volgograd Oblast, Russia. The population was 103 as of 2010.

== Geography ==
Dubrovsky is located in steppe, 44 km west of Uryupinsk (the district's administrative centre) by road. Rozovsky is the nearest rural locality.
