= Dubrov =

Dubrov (Russian: Дубров, Ukrainian: Дубров) is a Slavic masculine surname, its feminine counterpart is Dubrova. Notable people with the surname include:

- Anton Dubrov (born 1995), Belarusian tennis coach
- Denys Dubrov (born 1989), Ukrainian Paralympic swimmer
- Maryna Dubrova (born 1978), Ukrainian long-distance runner
- Pyotr Dubrov (born 1978), Russian engineer and astronaut
