= Dorota Dabrowska =

Polish statistician

Dorota Maria Dabrowska
- Education: University of Warsaw; University of California, Berkeley (PhD)
- Scientific career
- Fields: Statistics
- Workplaces: University of California, Los Angeles
- Thesis: Rank Tests for Independence for Bivariate Censored Data (1984)
- Doctoral advisor: Kjell Doksum

Dorota Maria Dabrowska is a Polish statistician known for applying nonparametric statistics and semiparametric models to counting processes and survival analysis. Dabrowska's estimator, from her paper "Kaplan–Meier estimate on the plane" (Annals of Statistics, 1988) is a widely used tool for bivariate survival under random censoring.

== Early life ==
Dąbrowska earned a master's degree in mathematics from the University of Warsaw. She completed her Ph.D. in statistics in 1984 at the University of California, Berkeley. Her dissertation, supervised by Kjell Doksum, was Rank Tests for Independence for Bivariate Censored Data.

== Career ==
After completing her doctorate, she joined the faculty at the University of California, Los Angeles, where she is a professor of biostatistics and statistics. At UCLA, she made fundamental contributions to the estimation and asymptotic theory in semi-Markov and Markov renewal models.

As well as being a researcher in statistics, Dabrowska is also one of the translators of an influential 1923 paper on randomized experiments by Jerzy Neyman, originally written in Polish.

Dabrowska is a Fellow of the Institute of Mathematical Statistics.
