= Dubrovka =

Dubrovka may refer to:

- Dubrovka (inhabited locality), name of several inhabited localities in Russia
- Dubrovka (Lyublinsko-Dmitrovskaya Line), a station of Moscow Metro, Moscow, Russia
- Dubrovka (Moscow Central Circle), a station of Moscow Metro
- Dubrovka Theater, where the Moscow theater hostage crisis took place on October 23, 2002
