= Dubrovsky, Kikvidzensky District, Volgograd Oblast =

Dubrovsky Дубровский
- Khutor
- Location within Volgograd Oblast Location within Russia
- Coordinates: 50°44′N 42°55′E
- Country: Russia
- Region: Volgograd Oblast
- District: Kikvidzensky District
- Time zone: UTC+4:00

Dubrovsky (Russian: Дубровский) is a rural locality (a khutor) and the administrative center of Dubrovskoye Rural Settlement, Kikvidzensky District, Volgograd Oblast, Russia. The population was 597 as of 2010. There are 4 streets.

== Geography ==
Dubrovsky is located on Khopyorsko-Buzulukskaya plain, on the right bank of the Buzuluk River, 15 km west of Preobrazhenskaya (the district's administrative centre) by road. Rasstrigin is the nearest rural locality.

== Climate ==
The climate is temperate continental (according to the Köppen climate classification - Dfb ). The long-term precipitation average is 458 mm. Precipitation is distributed relatively evenly throughout the city: the greatest amount of precipitation falls in June - 52 mm, the least in February and March - 25 mm each. The average annual temperature is above zero and is + 6.7 °C, the average temperature of the coldest month, January, is -9.3 °C, and the hottest month, July, is + 21.6 °C.
