= Gierałtowice, Opole Voivodeship =

Gierałtowice Gieraltowitz
- Village
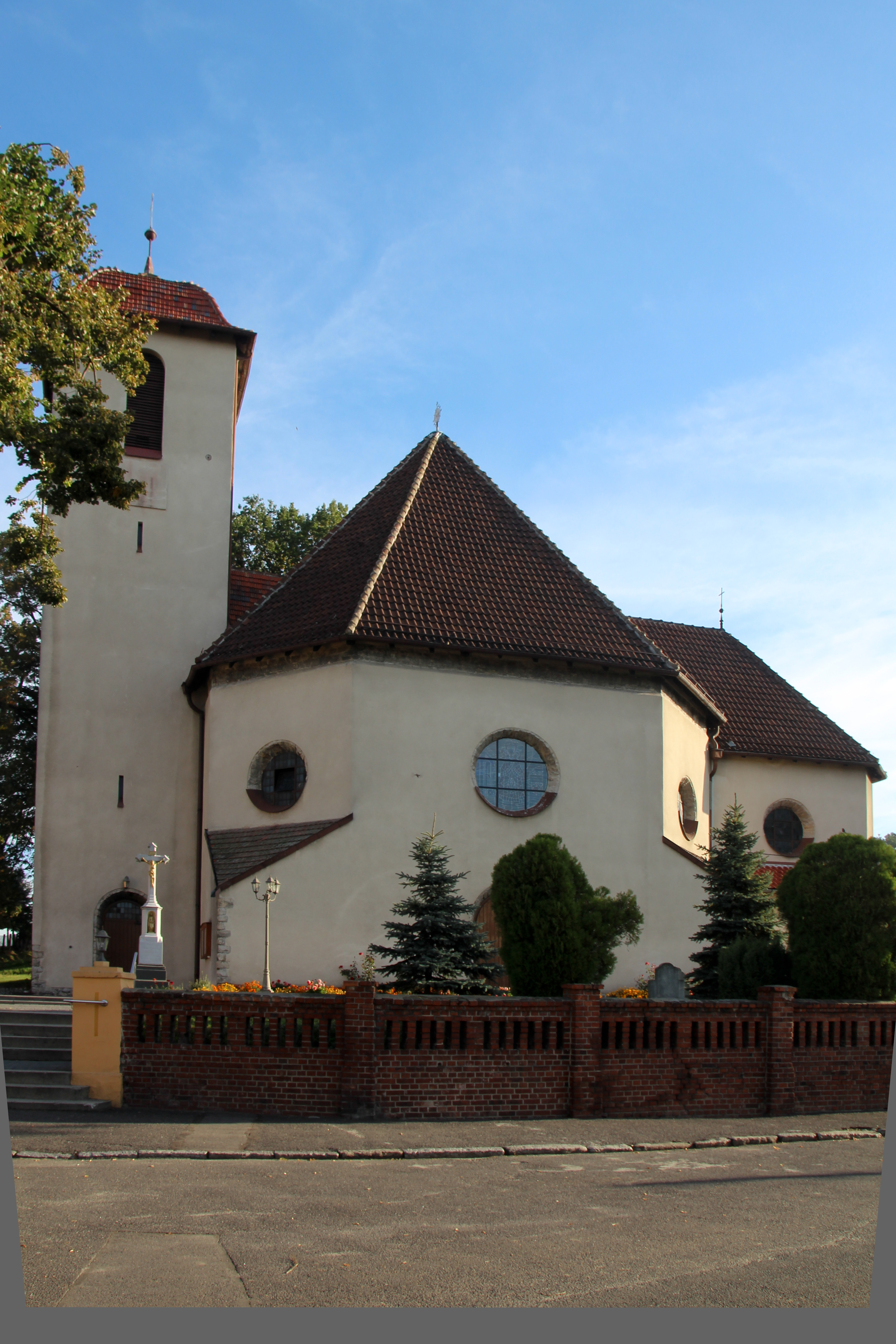

- Location within Poland
- Coordinates: 50°16′26″N 18°5′22″E
- Country: Poland
- Voivodeship: Opole
- County: Kędzierzyn-Koźle
- Gmina: Reńska Wieś
- Population: 337

Gierałtowice [ɡʲɛrau̯tɔˈvit͡sɛ], additional name in German: Gieraltowitz, is a village in the administrative district of Gmina Reńska Wieś, within Kędzierzyn-Koźle County, Opole Voivodeship, in south-western Poland.
