= Stanislawa Dabrowski =

Australian humanitarian (1926–2020)

Stanislawa "Stasia" Dabrowski (Polish: Stanisława Dąbrowska; 1926 - August 2020) was a Polish-Australian humanitarian. In 1996, the government of the Australian Capital Territory named her Citizen of the Year. She was awarded a medal of the Order of Australia in 1998.
