= Dubrovskoye, Vologda Oblast =

Dubrovskoye Дубровское
- Settlement
- Location within Vologda Oblast Location within Russia
- Coordinates: 59°20′N 39°48′E
- Country: Russia
- Region: Vologda Oblast
- District: Vologodsky District
- Time zone: UTC+3:00

Dubrovskoye (Russian: Дубровское) is a rural locality (a settlement) in Semyonkovskoye Rural Settlement, Vologodsky District, Vologda Oblast, Russia. The population was 1,054 as of 2002. There are 11 streets.

== Geography ==
Dubrovskoye is located 16 km north of Vologda (the district's administrative centre) by road. Obukhovo is the nearest rural locality.
