= Dubrovsky, Vladimir Oblast =

Dubrovsky Дубровский
- Settlement
- Location within Vladimir Oblast Location within Russia
- Coordinates: 55°19′N 40°36′E
- Country: Russia
- Region: Vladimir Oblast
- District: Gus-Khrustalny District
- Time zone: UTC+3:00

Dubrovsky (Russian: Дубровский) is a rural locality (a settlement) in Posyolok Velikodvorsky, Gus-Khrustalny District, Vladimir Oblast, Russia. The population was 14 as of 2010.

== Geography ==
The village is located 11 km north from Velikodvorsky, 45 km south from Gus-Khrustalny.
