= Kazimierz Dąbrowski (field hockey) =

Polish field hockey player (1936–2025)

Personal information
- Nationality: Polish
- Born: 14 February 1936 Gniezno, Poland
- Died: 27 March 2025 (aged 89)

Sport
- Sport: Field hockey

Kazimierz Dąbrowski (14 February 1936 – 27 March 2025) was a Polish field hockey player. He competed in the men's tournament at the 1960 Summer Olympics. Dąbrowski died on 27 March 2025, at the age of 89.
