= Jan Dembowski (general) =

Jan Dembowski (Dębowski) (1770, Dębowa Góra – 1823) was a Polish general (promoted in 1812) and political activist.

== Military career ==
In 1812 he was appointed to the Army of the Kingdom of Italy, where he commanded a brigade before being transferred onto the staff of Pino's 15th (Italian) Division of Eugène de Beauharnais's IV Corps during Napoleon's invasion of Russia. He led a brigade of the 15th (Italian) Division at the Battle of Maloyaroslavets on 24 October.

Napoleon's defeat and Russian rule of Poland made it impossible for him to return there. He was the father of astronomer Ercole Dembowski, who lived out his life in Italy.
