= St. Hedwig of Silesia Church, Radoszowy =

Coordinates: 50.1228°N 18.0223°E

St. Hedwig of Silesia Church
- Kościół św. Jadwigi Śląskiej w Radoszowach
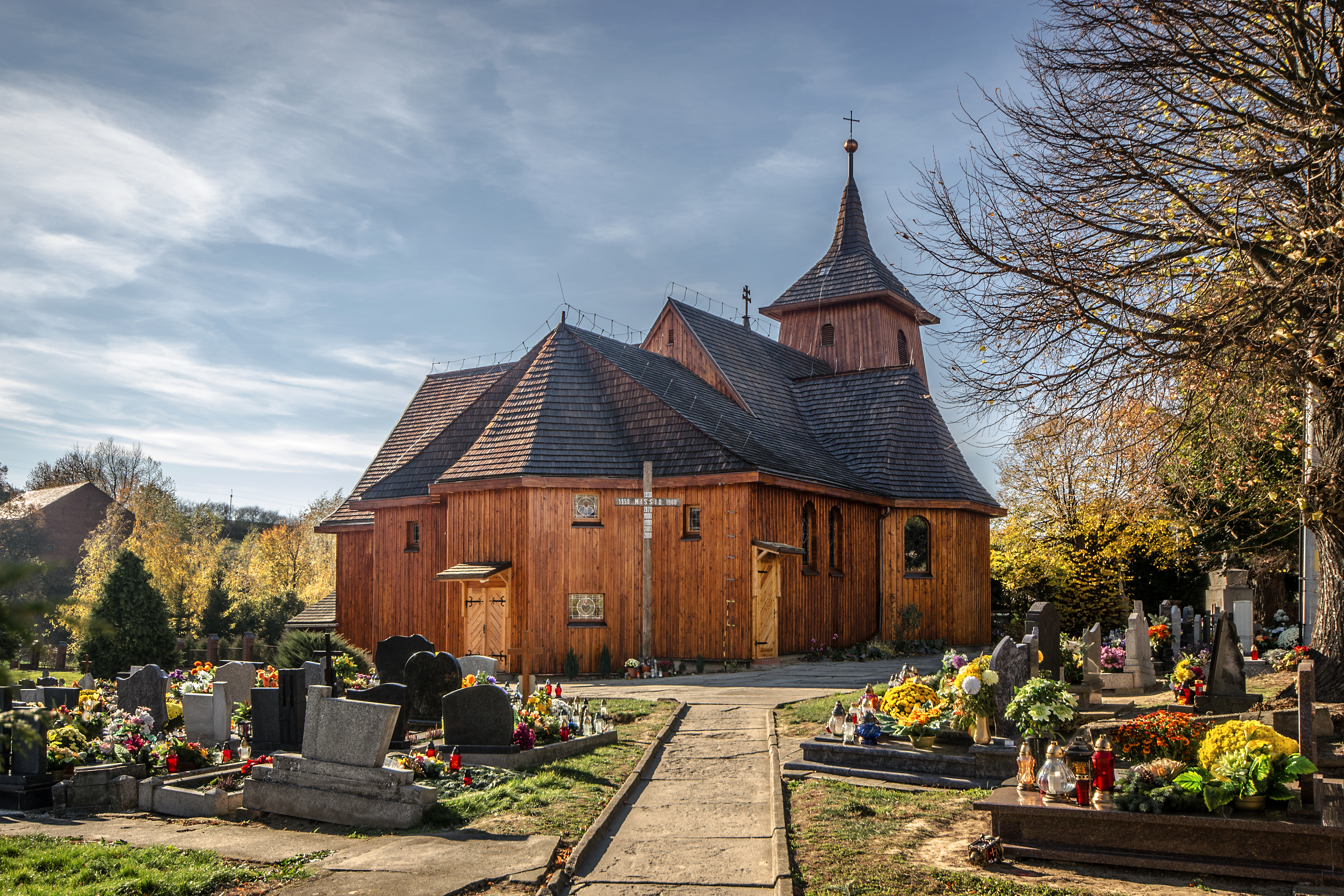
- St. Hedwig of Silesia Church
- St. Hedwig of Silesia Church
- Location: Radoszowy
- Country: Poland
- Denomination: Roman Catholic

History
- Founder: Albert Kőhler

Architecture
- Completed: 1929

Specifications
- Materials: Wood

Administration
- Diocese: Roman Catholic Diocese of Opole
- Parish: Parafia św. Jadwigi w Radoszowach

St. Hedwig of Silesia Church is a wooden parish church located in Radoszowy, Kędzierzyn-Koźle County in Poland.

The former church was built in 1730. Until 1929, the church was dedicated to the Holy Cross. The church was renovated in 1890 and dismantled in 1928. The present church was built in 1929, as projected by architect Albert Kőhler from Pawłowiczki. The church underwent renovated in 2000, when its eternit roof was replaced with wood shingle.
