= St. Brice's Church, Gościęcin =

Coordinates: 50.1720°N 17.5829°E

St. Brice's Church
- Kościół św. Brykcjusza w Gościęcinie
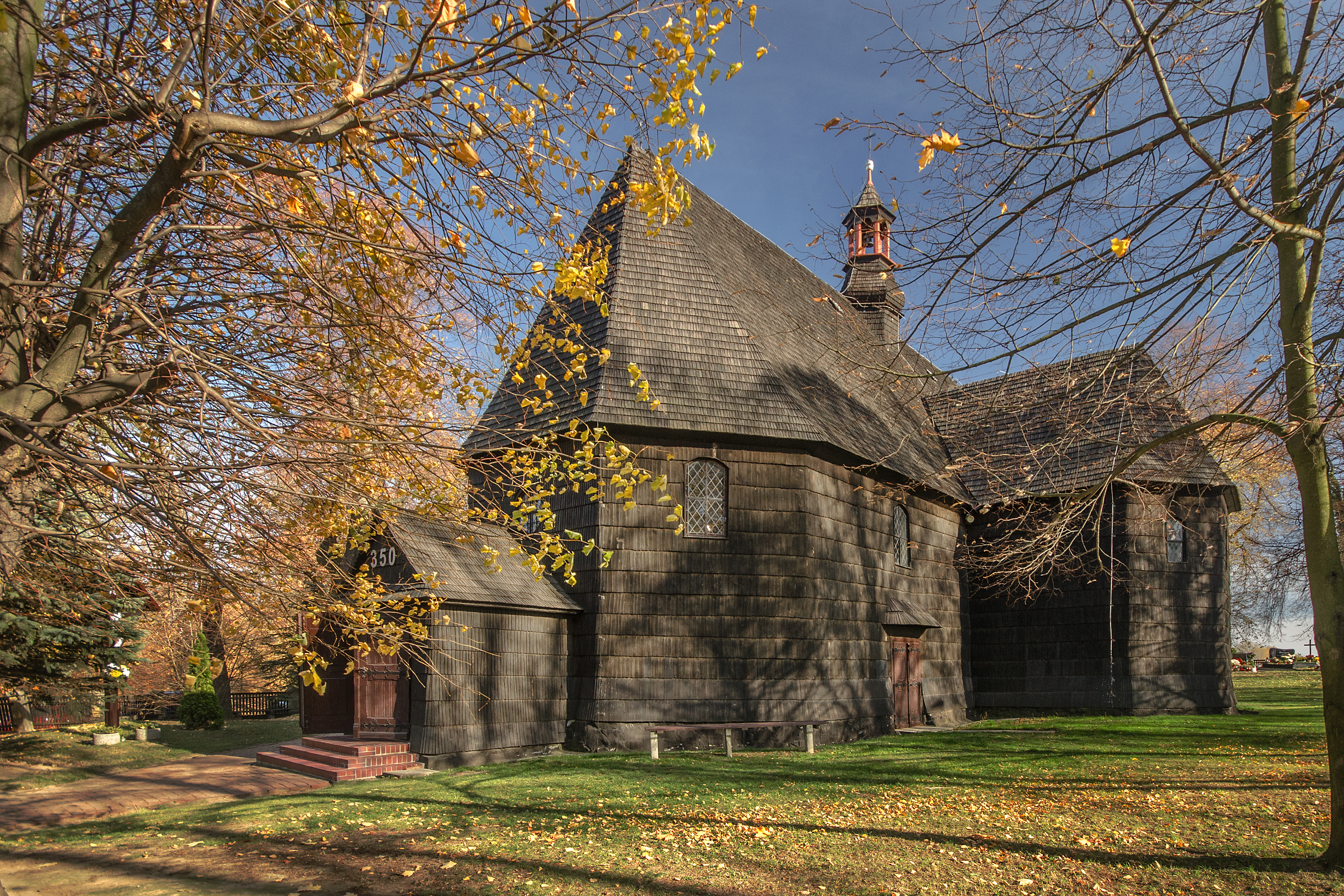
- St. Brice's Church
- St. Brice's Church
- Location: Bryksy, Gościęcin
- Country: Poland
- Denomination: Roman Catholic

History
- Founder(s): Marta Wolff, Marcin Wolff

Architecture
- Completed: 1661

Specifications
- Materials: Wood

Administration
- Diocese: Roman Catholic Diocese of Opole
- Parish: Parafia Wniebowzięcia NMP w Gościęcinie

St. Brice's Church in Gościęcin, Poland, is a historic, wooden shrine belonging to the Parish of the Assumption of the Holy Virgin Mary in Gościęcin.

The church was built in 1661 (renovated in 1880 and dedicated to St. Brice). Formerly, in its location stood a wooden chapel from 1594. The church was funded by Marta and Marcin Wolff, the latter the owner of the sołectwo in Gościęcin. The church was built on the peripheries of the village, on a nearby hill. There, in its peripheries stands a water well (St. Brice's Well), which is given healing properties. Additionally, there is a hermitage in the area (from before 1870), presently transformed into a mountain hut. The whole church area is known as Bryksy.
