= Chrósty, Opole Voivodeship =

Chrósty
- Village
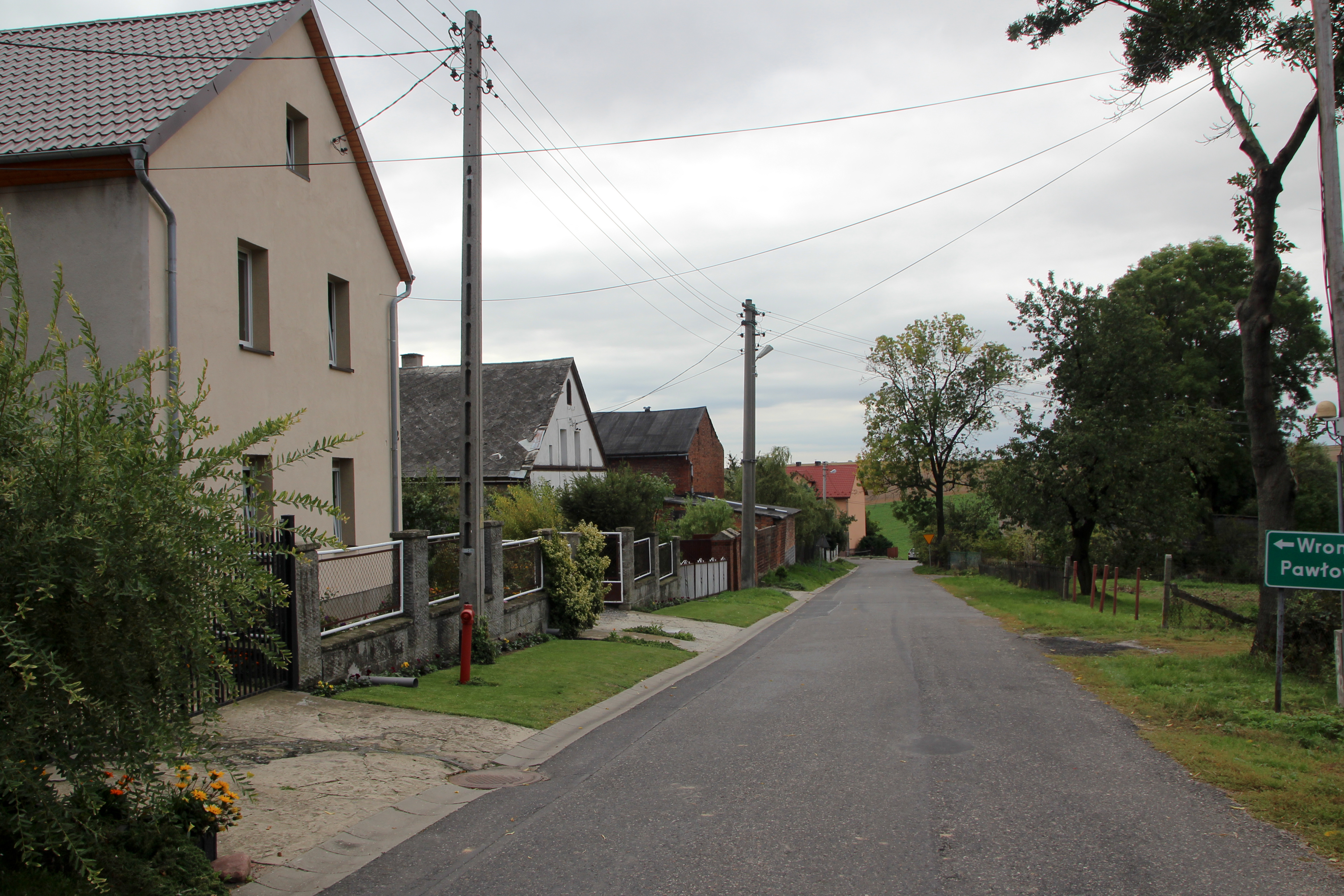

- Location within Poland
- Coordinates: 50°13′21″N 18°2′47″E
- Country: Poland
- Voivodeship: Opole
- County: Kędzierzyn-Koźle
- Gmina: Pawłowiczki
- Population: 112
- Website: Chrosty

Chrósty [ˈxrustɨ] (German: Chrost) is a village in the administrative district of Gmina Pawłowiczki, within Kędzierzyn-Koźle County, Opole Voivodeship, in south-western Poland.
