= Ucieszków =

Ucieszków Autischkau
- Village
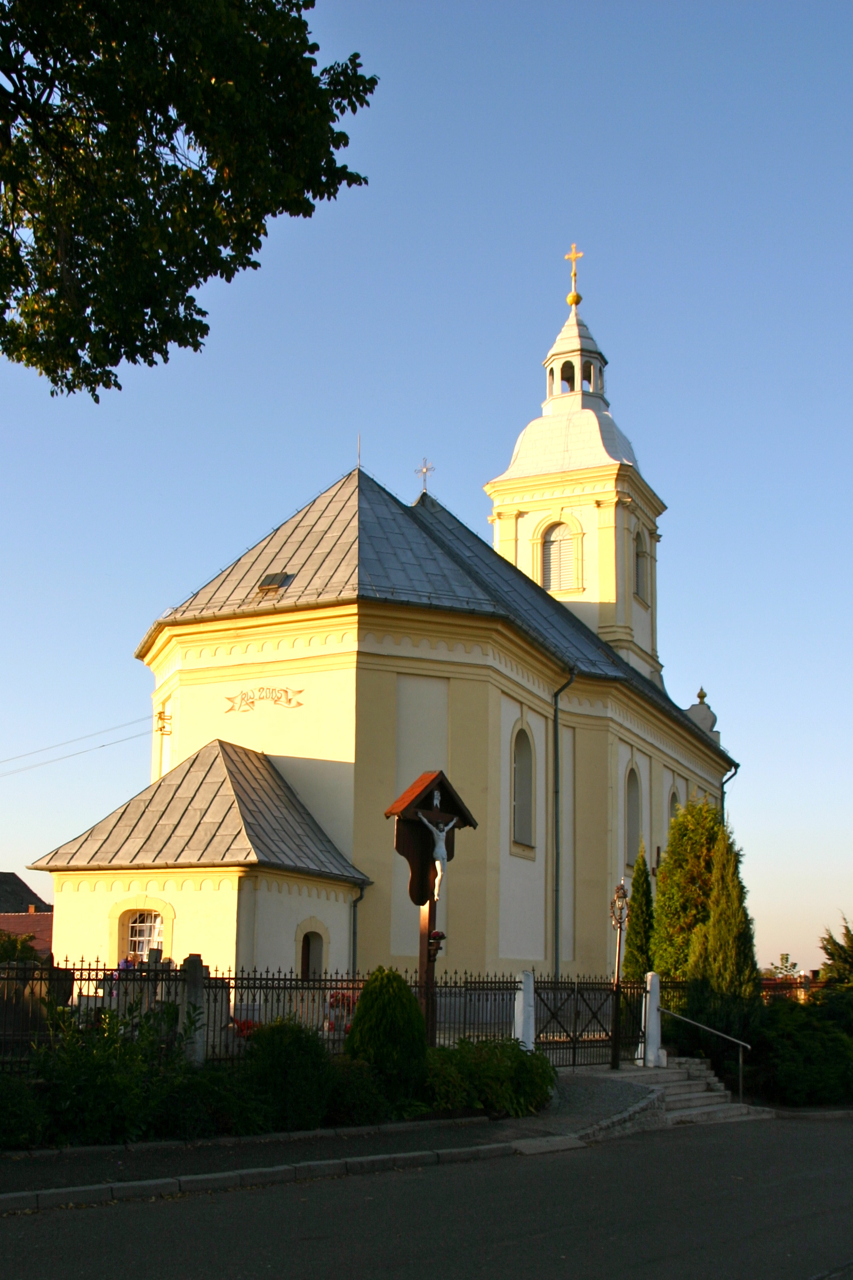

- Location within Poland
- Coordinates: 50°13′50″N 17°59′44″E
- Country: Poland
- Voivodeship: Opole
- County: Kędzierzyn-Koźle
- Gmina: Pawłowiczki

Ucieszków [uˈt͡ɕɛʂkuf], additional name in German: Autischkau, is a village in the administrative district of Gmina Pawłowiczki, within Kędzierzyn-Koźle County, Opole Voivodeship, in south-western Poland.

== See also ==
- Territorial changes of Poland after World War II
