= Ligota Wielka, Kędzierzyn-Koźle County =

Ligota Wielka
- Village
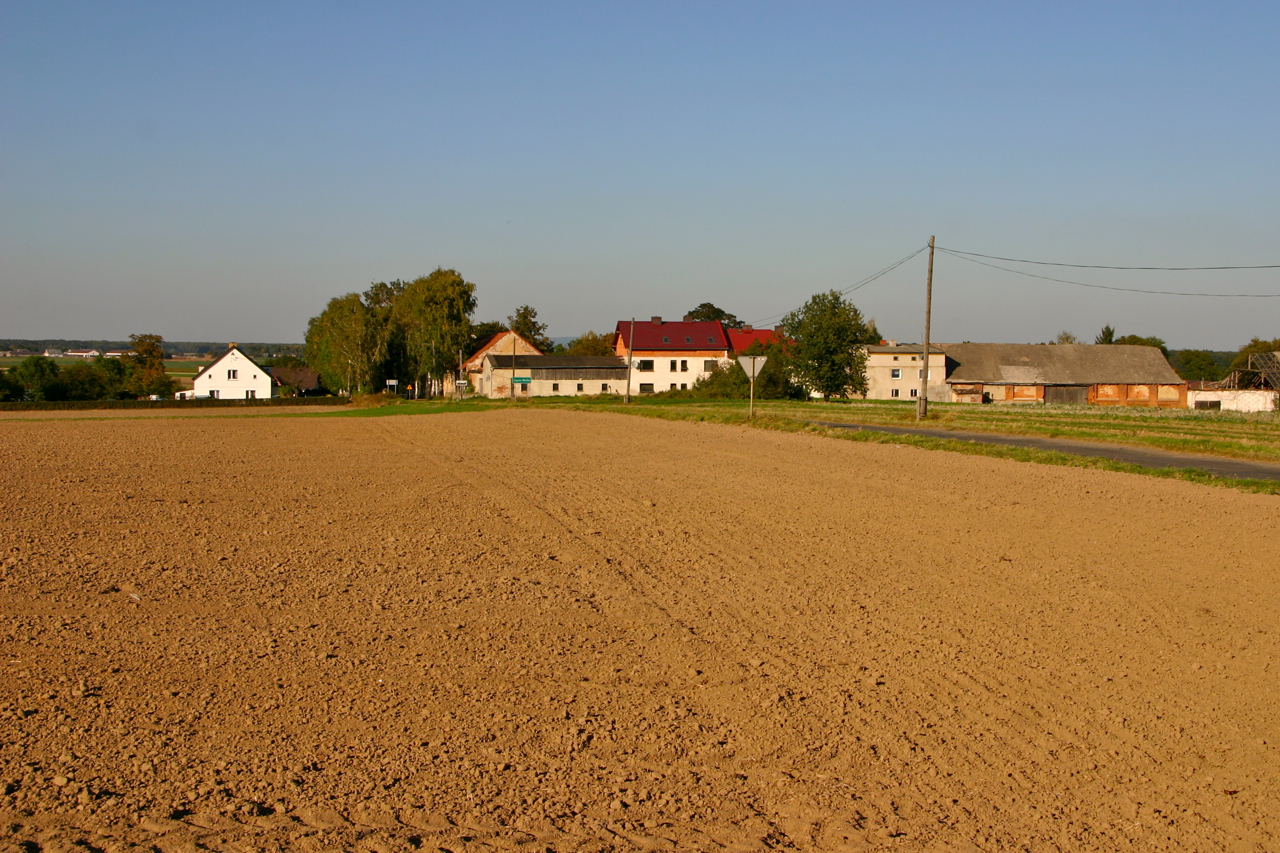

- Location within Poland
- Coordinates: 50°16′45″N 18°1′41″E
- Country: Poland
- Voivodeship: Opole
- County: Kędzierzyn-Koźle
- Gmina: Pawłowiczki
- Population: 90

Ligota Wielka [liˈɡɔta ˈvjɛlka] (German: Gross Ellguth) is a village in the administrative district of Gmina Pawłowiczki, within Kędzierzyn-Koźle County, Opole Voivodeship, in south-western Poland.
