= Maciowakrze =

Maciowakrze Matzkirch
- Village
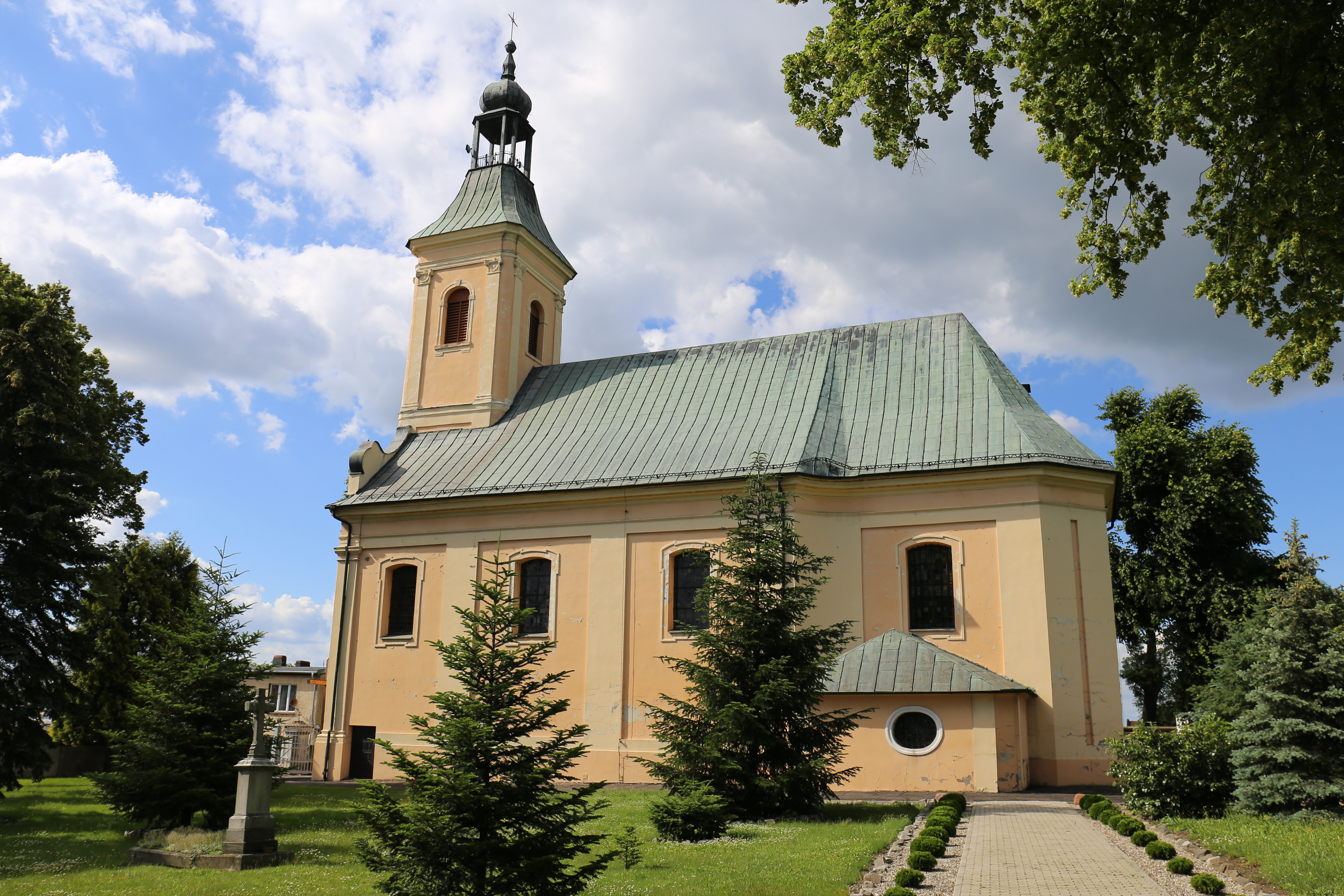
- Catholic church

- Location within Poland
- Coordinates: 50°11′N 18°1′E
- Country: Poland
- Voivodeship: Opole
- County: Kędzierzyn-Koźle
- Gmina: Pawłowiczki

Maciowakrze [mat͡ɕɔˈvakʂɛ], additional name in German: Matzkirch, is a village in the administrative district of Gmina Pawłowiczki, within Kędzierzyn-Koźle County, Opole Voivodeship, in south-western Poland.
