= Przedborowice =

- Village
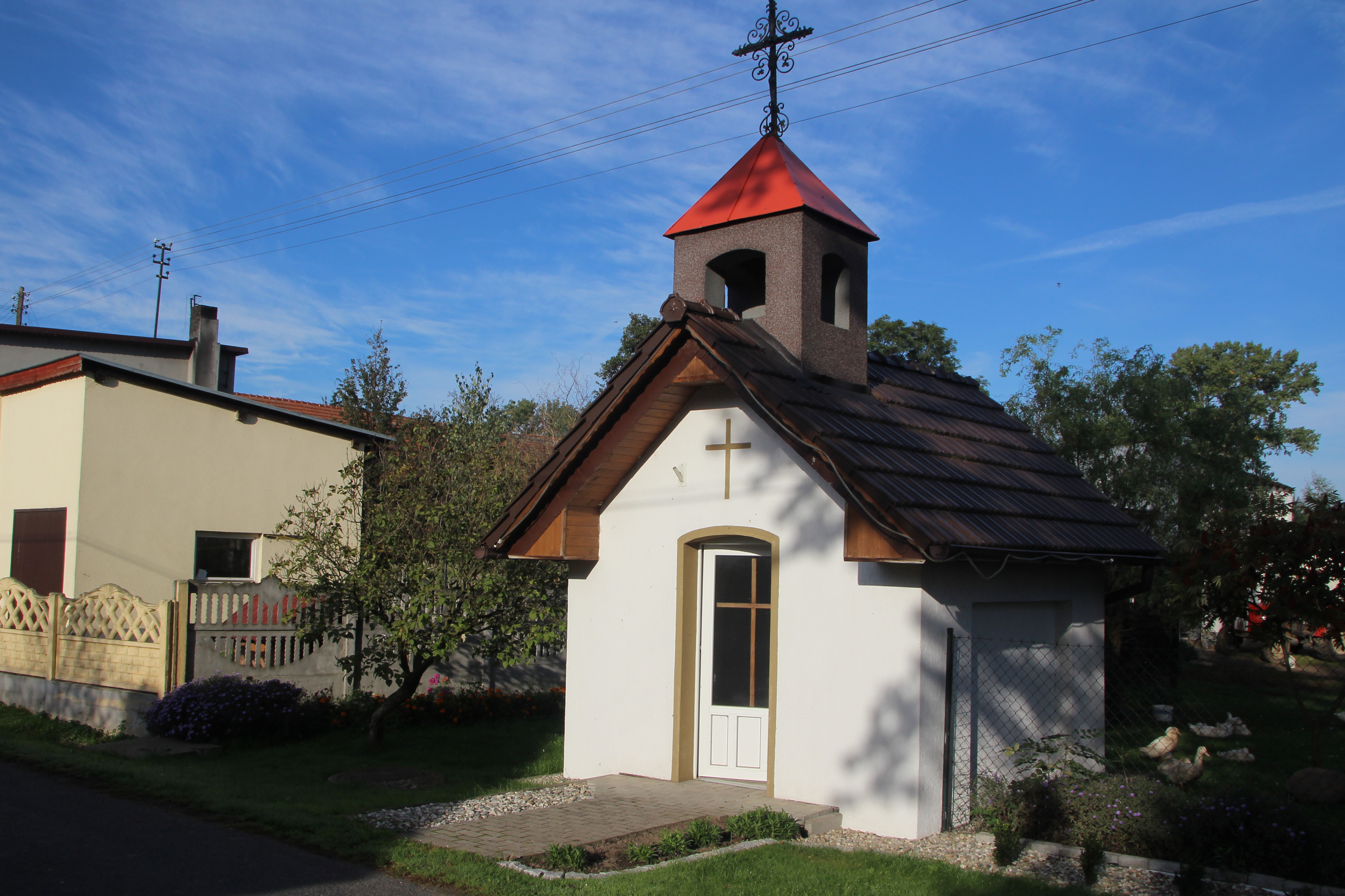
- Chapel

- Location within Poland
- Coordinates: 50°15′45″N 18°5′1″E
- Country: Poland
- Voivodeship: Opole
- County: Kędzierzyn-Koźle
- Gmina: Pawłowiczki
- Population: 95

Przedborowice [pʂɛdbɔrɔˈvit͡sɛ] (German: Przeborowitz) is a village in the administrative district of Gmina Pawłowiczki, within Kędzierzyn-Koźle County, Opole Voivodeship, in south-western Poland.
