= Ostroznica =

Ostroznica may refer to:

- Ostrožnica, a village in Bosnia and Herzegovina
- Ostrożnica, a village in Poland
- Ostrožnica, Snina District, a village in Slovakia
