= Borzysławice =

Borzysławice Borislawitz
- Village
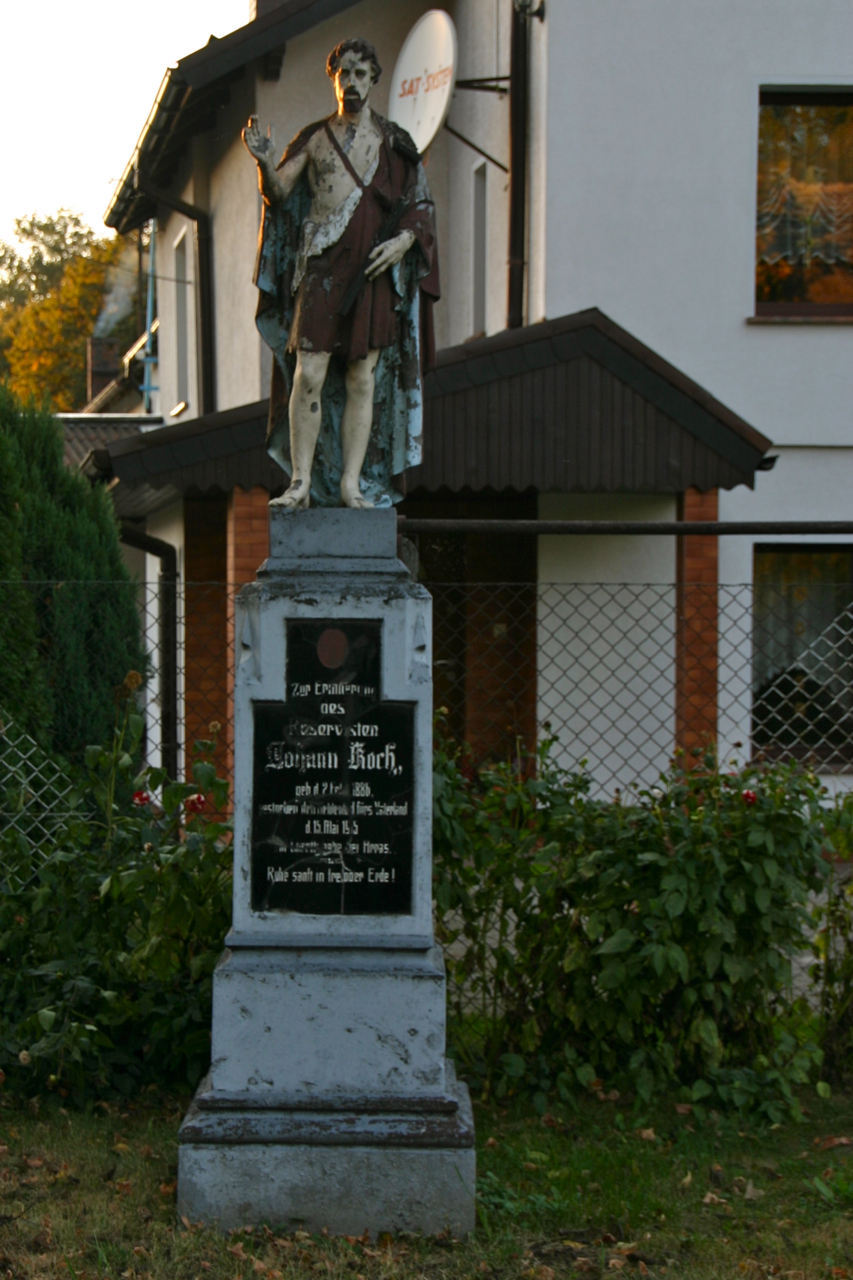

- Location within Poland
- Coordinates: 50°15′N 18°0′E
- Country: Poland
- Voivodeship: Opole
- County: Kędzierzyn-Koźle
- Gmina: Pawłowiczki

Borzysławice [bɔʐɨswaˈvit͡sɛ], additional name in German: Borislawitz, is a village in the administrative district of Gmina Pawłowiczki, within Kędzierzyn-Koźle County, Opole Voivodeship, in south-western Poland.
