= Dobrosławice, Opole Voivodeship =

Dobrosławice Dobroslawitz
- Village
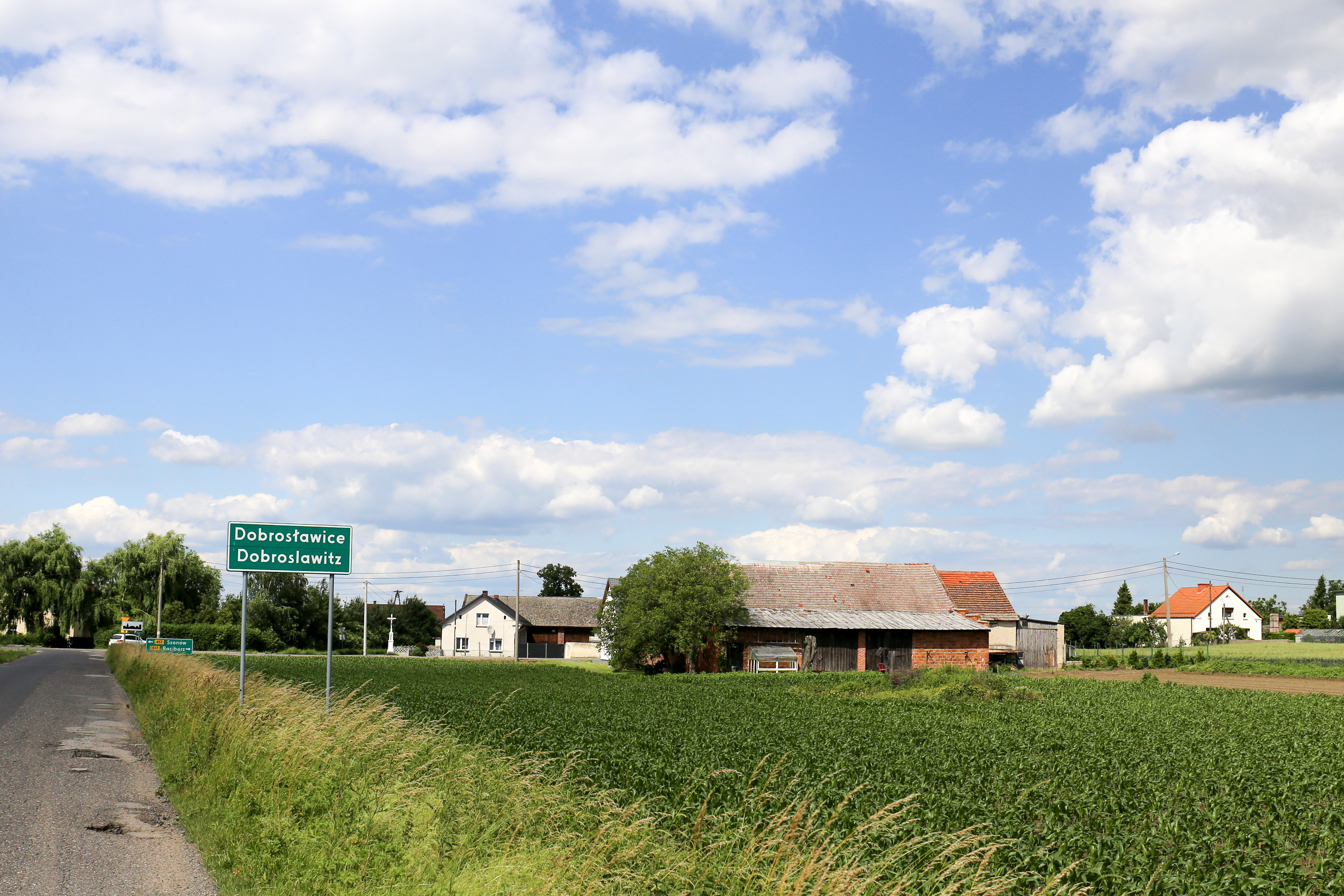
- Dobrosławice in 2020

- Location within Poland
- Coordinates: 50°11′52″N 18°0′7″E
- Country: Poland
- Voivodeship: Opole
- County: Kędzierzyn-Koźle
- Gmina: Pawłowiczki
- Population: 200

Dobrosławice [dɔbrɔswaˈvit͡sɛ], additional name in German: Dobroslawitz, is a village in the administrative district of Gmina Pawłowiczki, within Kędzierzyn-Koźle County, Opole Voivodeship, in south-western Poland.
