= Grudynia Wielka =

- Village
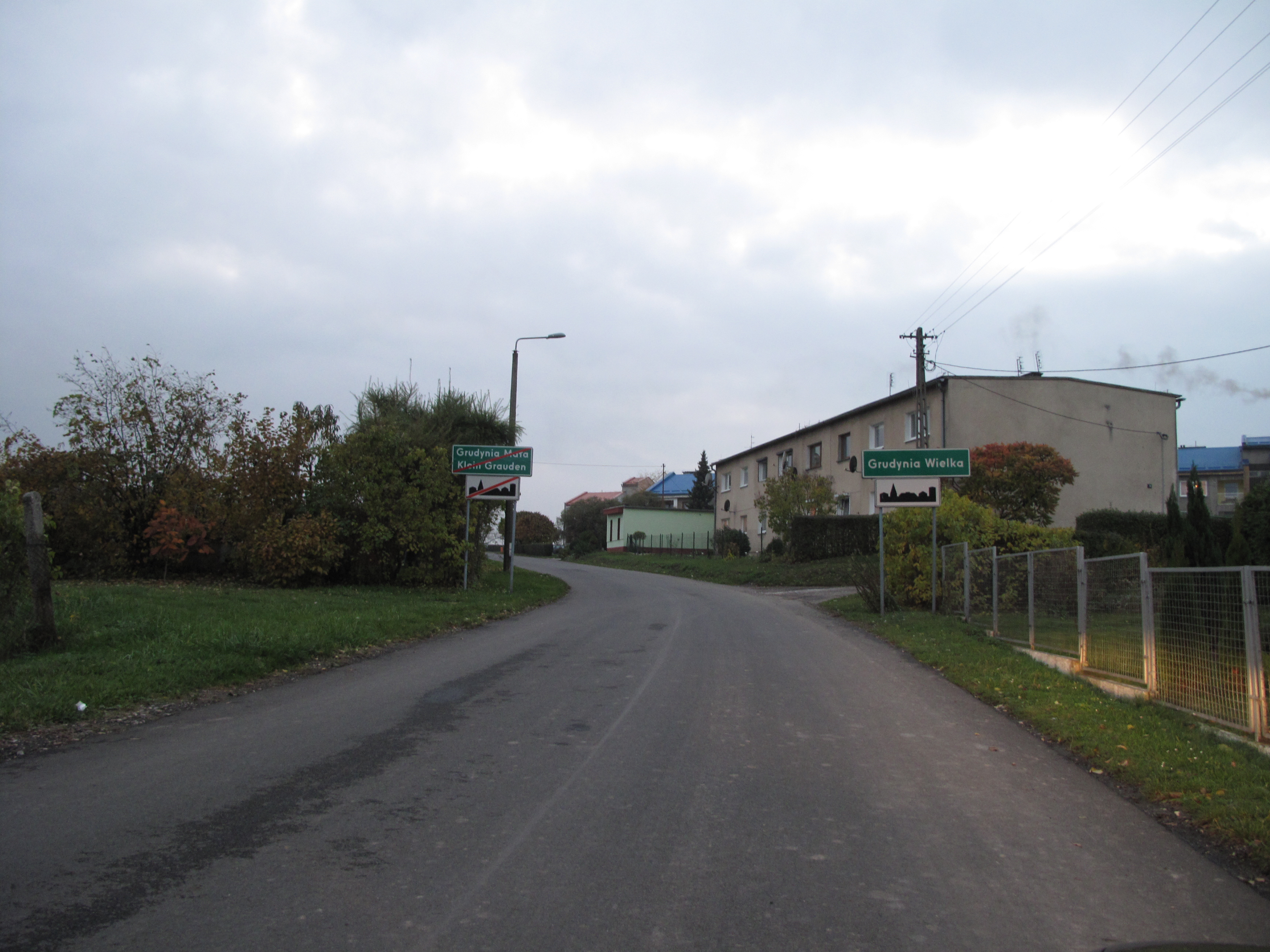
- Entrance to the village

- Location within Poland
- Coordinates: 50°14′N 17°56′E
- Country: Poland
- Voivodeship: Opole
- County: Kędzierzyn-Koźle
- Gmina: Pawłowiczki

Grudynia Wielka [ɡruˈdɨɲa ˈvjɛlka] (German: Gross Grauden) is a village in the administrative district of Gmina Pawłowiczki, within Kędzierzyn-Koźle County, Opole Voivodeship, in south-western Poland.
