= Trawniki, Opole Voivodeship =

Trawniki Trawnig
- Village
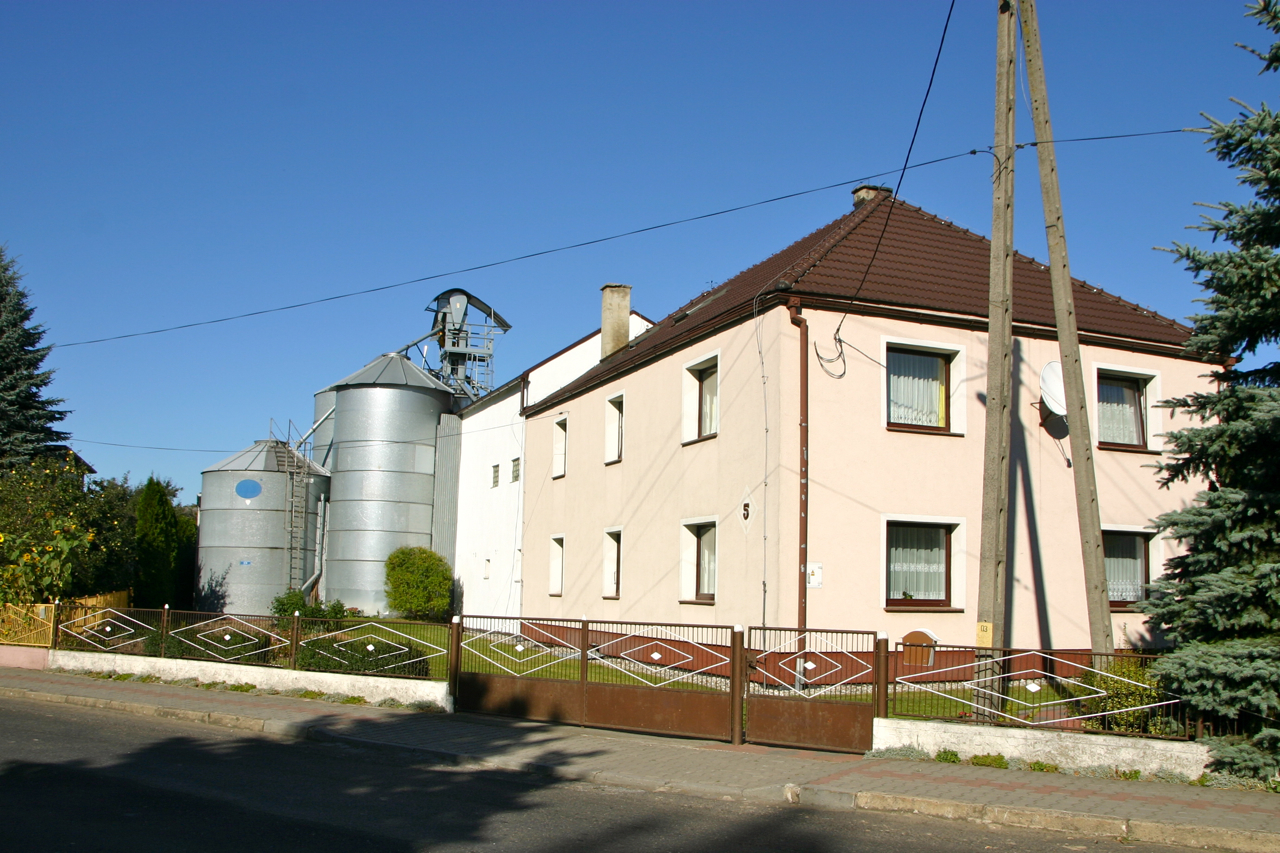

- Location within Poland
- Coordinates: 50°18′42″N 17°58′36″E
- Country: Poland
- Voivodeship: Opole
- County: Kędzierzyn-Koźle
- Gmina: Pawłowiczki
- First mentioned: 1224
- Time zone: UTC+1 (CET)
  - Summer (DST): UTC+2 (CEST)
- Vehicle registration: OK

Trawniki [travˈniki], additional name in German: Trawnig, is a village in the administrative district of Gmina Pawłowiczki, within Kędzierzyn-Koźle County, Opole Voivodeship, in south-western Poland.

== Etymology ==
The name of the village is of Polish origin and comes from the word trawnik, which means "lawn". The oldest mention in documents comes from 1224, when it was part of fragmented Piast-ruled Poland. In the Geographical Dictionary of the Kingdom of Poland from 1892, it was mentioned as Trawnik. Under Nazi Germany, the village was renamed to Grünweide in 1936 to erase traces of Polish origin.
