= Milice (disambiguation) =

The Milice was a Vichy French paramilitary organisation.

Milice may also refer to the following places in Poland:

- Milice, Opole Voivodeship (south-west Poland)
- Milice, West Pomeranian Voivodeship (north-west Poland)

== See also ==
- Militia
