= Naczęsławice =

Naczęsławice Groß Nimsdorf
- Village
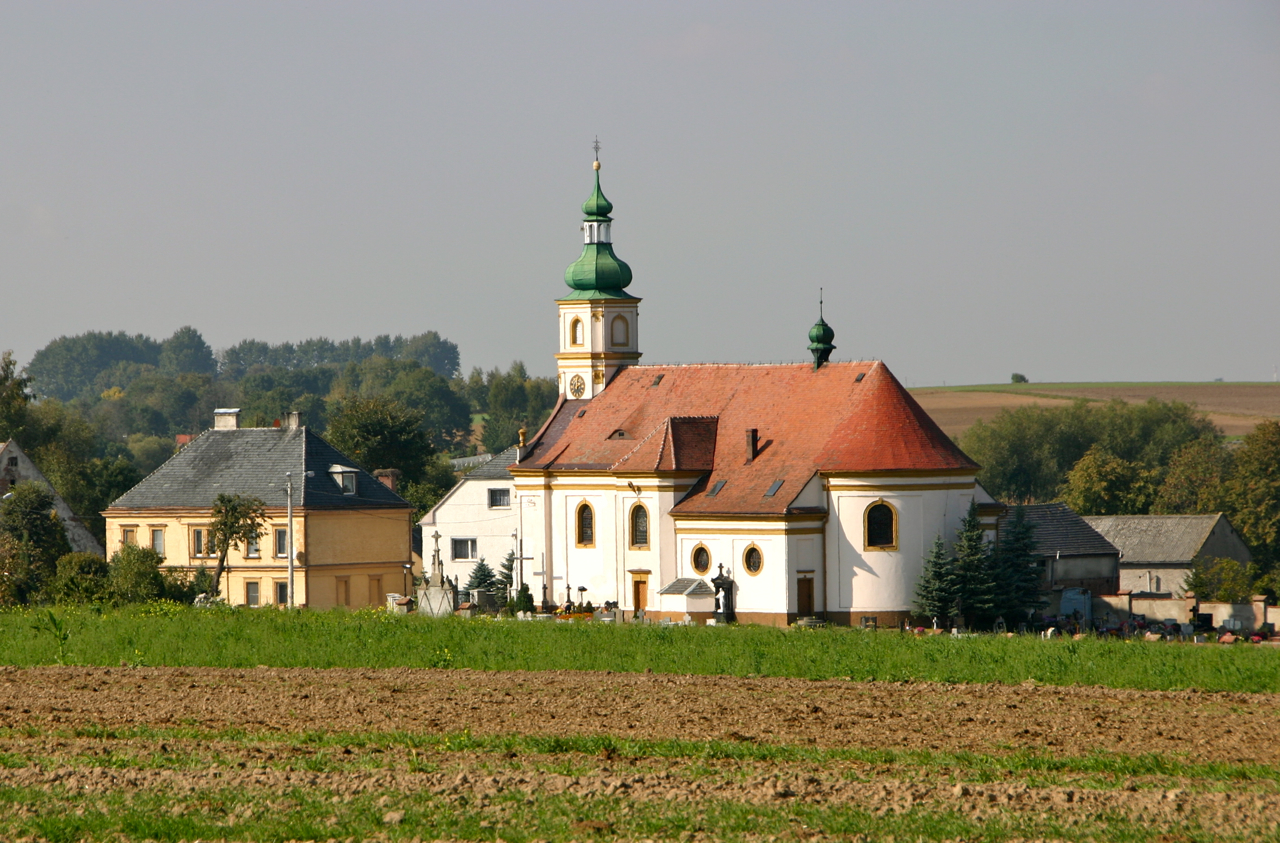

- Location within Poland
- Coordinates: 50°18′N 17°56′E
- Country: Poland
- Voivodeship: Opole
- County: Kędzierzyn-Koźle
- Gmina: Pawłowiczki
- Population: 515
- Website: http://www.naczeslawice.pl

Naczęsławice [nat͡ʂɛ̃swaˈvit͡sɛ], additional name in German: Groß Nimsdorf, is a village in the administrative district of Gmina Pawłowiczki, within Kędzierzyn-Koźle County, Opole Voivodeship, in south-western Poland.
