= Dobieszów, Kędzierzyn-Koźle County =

Dobieszów
- Village
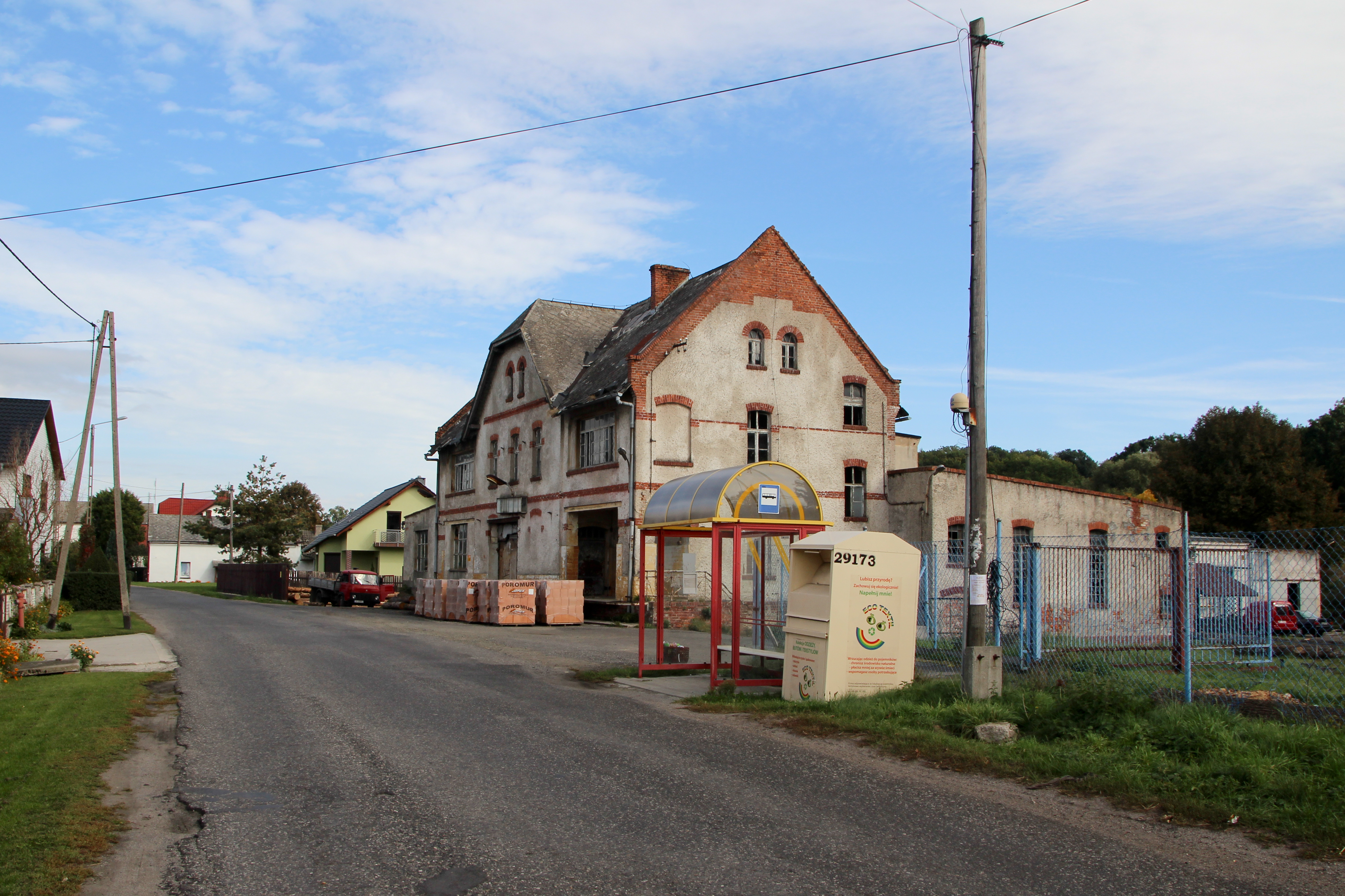

- Location within Poland
- Coordinates: 50°13′2″N 18°0′50″E
- Country: Poland
- Voivodeship: Opole
- County: Kędzierzyn-Koźle
- Gmina: Pawłowiczki

Dobieszów [dɔˈbjɛʂuf] (German: Dobischau) is a village in the administrative district of Gmina Pawłowiczki, within Kędzierzyn-Koźle County, Opole Voivodeship, in south-western Poland.
