= Grodzisko, Kędzierzyn-Koźle County =

Grodzisko Grötsch
- Village
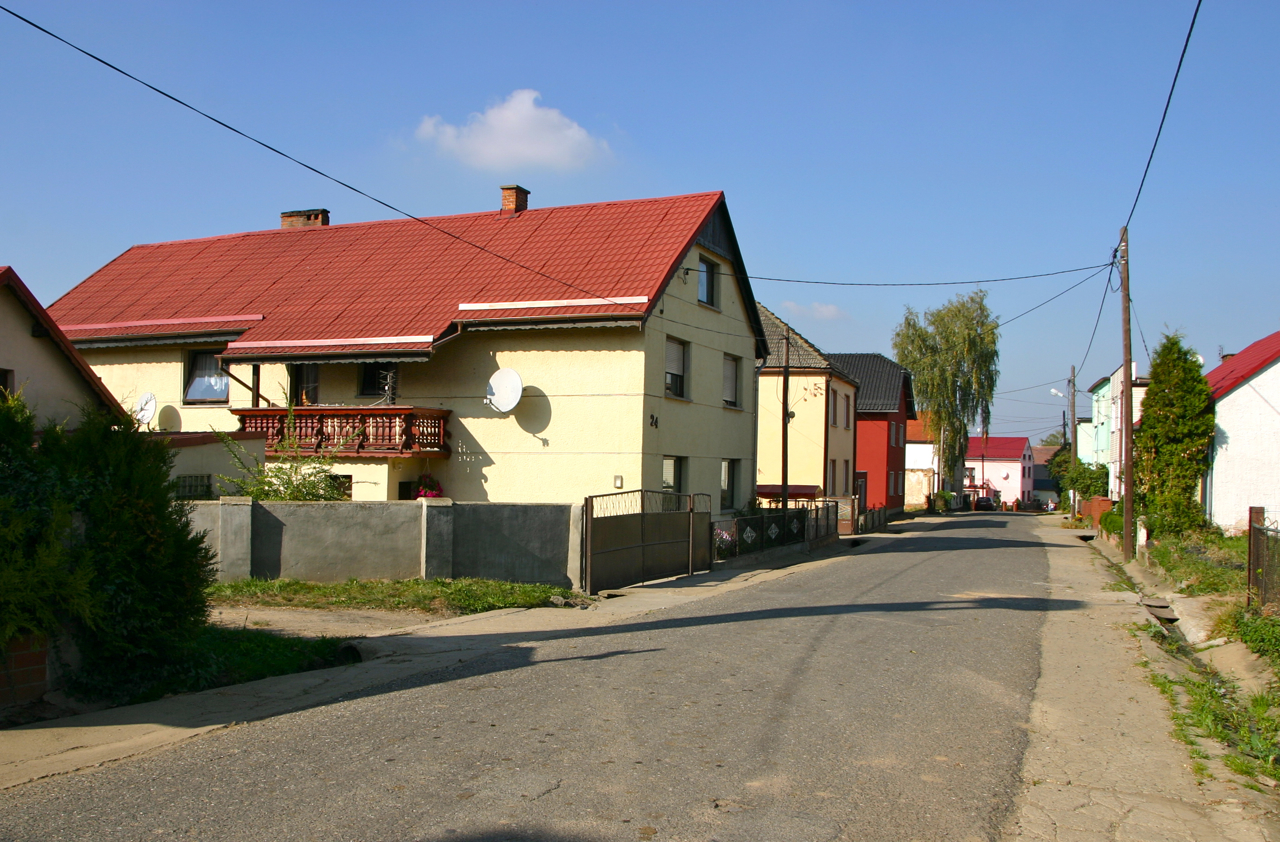

- Location within Poland
- Coordinates: 50°18′14″N 17°55′45″E
- Country: Poland
- Voivodeship: Opole
- County: Kędzierzyn-Koźle
- Gmina: Pawłowiczki

Grodzisko [ɡrɔˈd͡ʑiskɔ], additional name in German: Grötsch, is a village in the administrative district of Gmina Pawłowiczki, within Kędzierzyn-Koźle County, Opole Voivodeship, in south-western Poland.
