= Jakubowice, Kędzierzyn-Koźle County =

Jakubowice
- Village
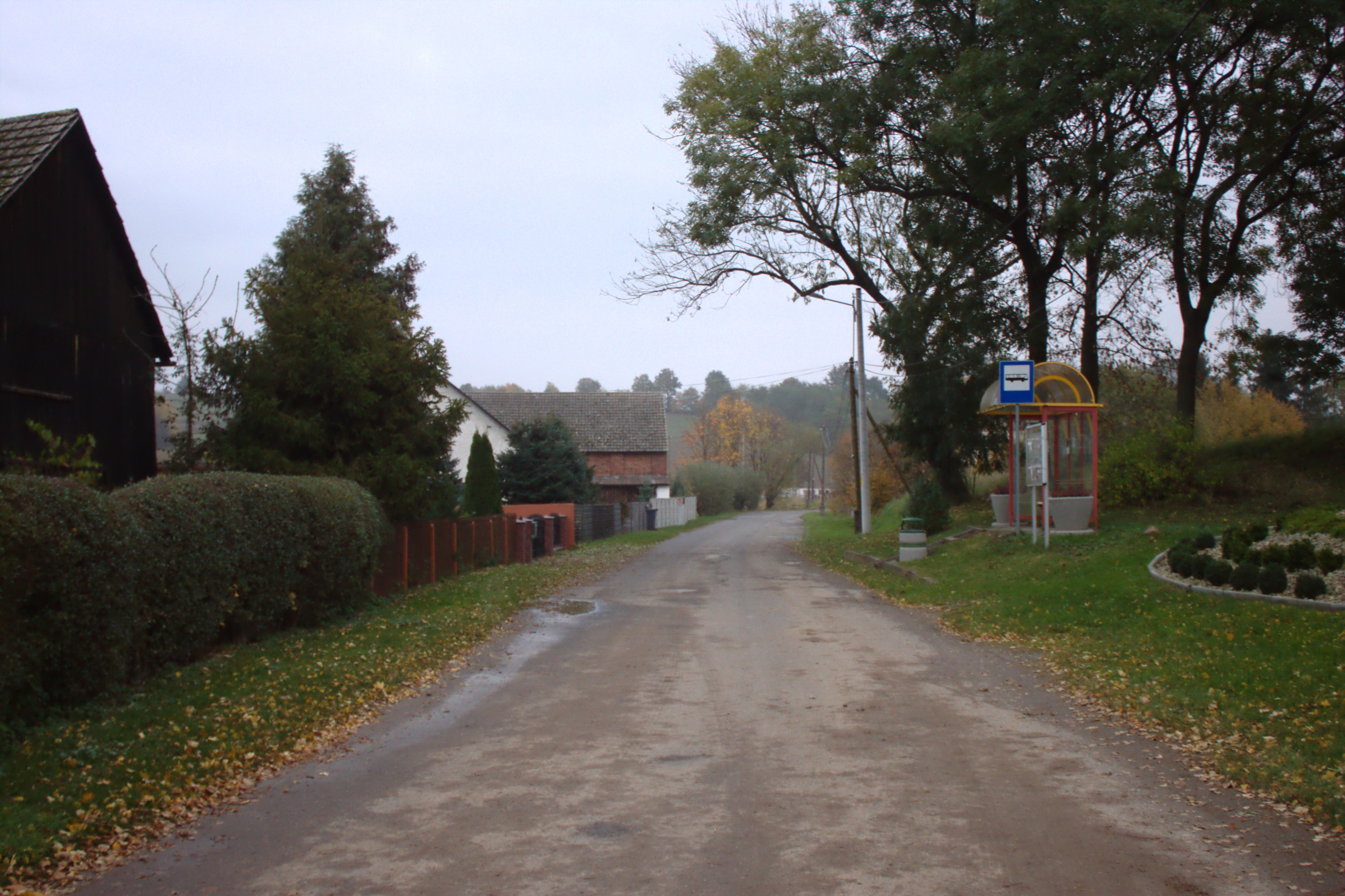
- Road

- Location within Poland
- Coordinates: 50°14′30″N 17°56′8″E
- Country: Poland
- Voivodeship: Opole
- County: Kędzierzyn-Koźle
- Gmina: Pawłowiczki

Jakubowice [jakubɔˈvit͡sɛ] (German: Jakobsdorf) is a village in the administrative district of Gmina Pawłowiczki, within Kędzierzyn-Koźle County, Opole Voivodeship, in south-western Poland.

== Gallery ==
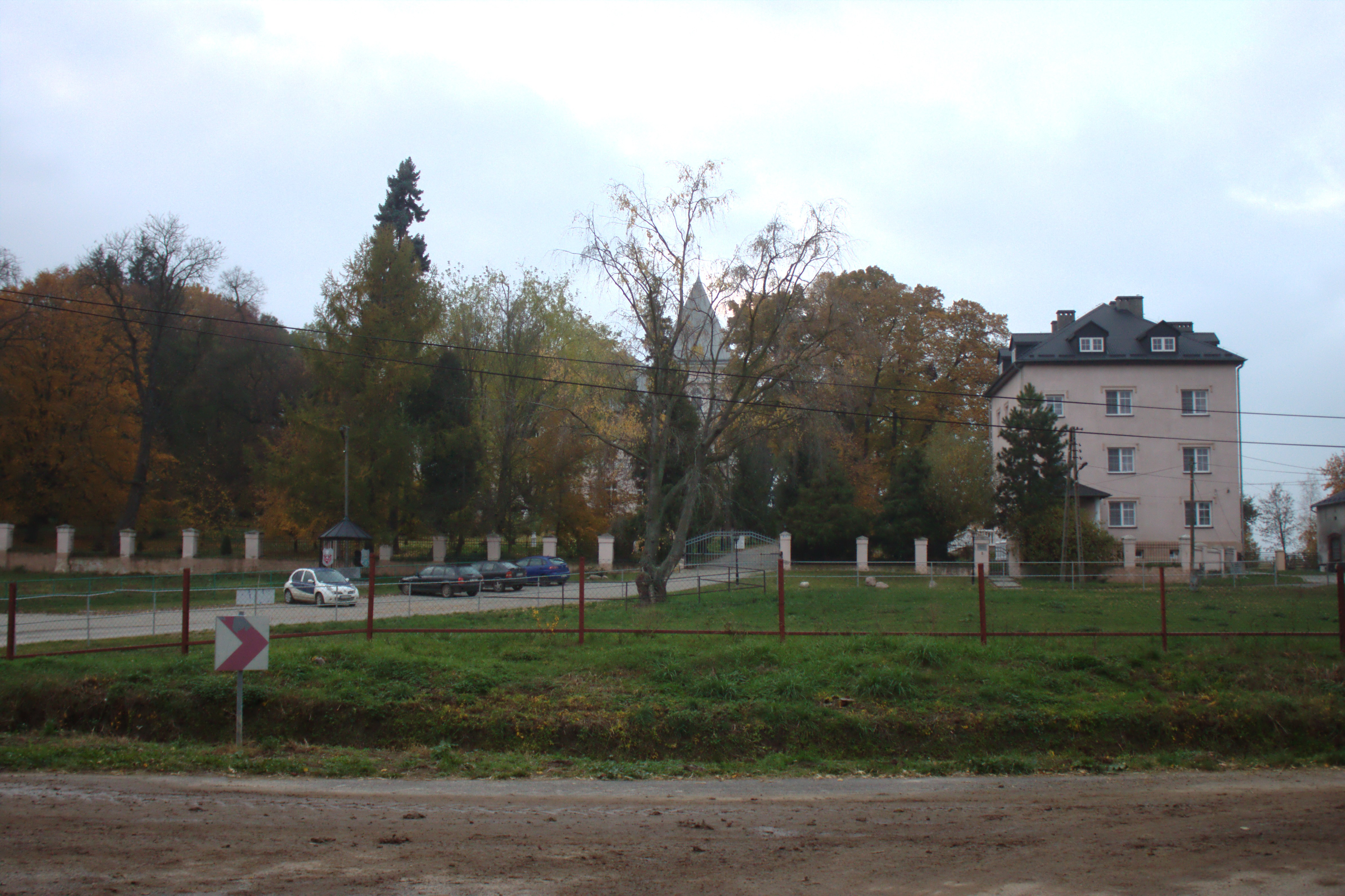
Trees behind the castle

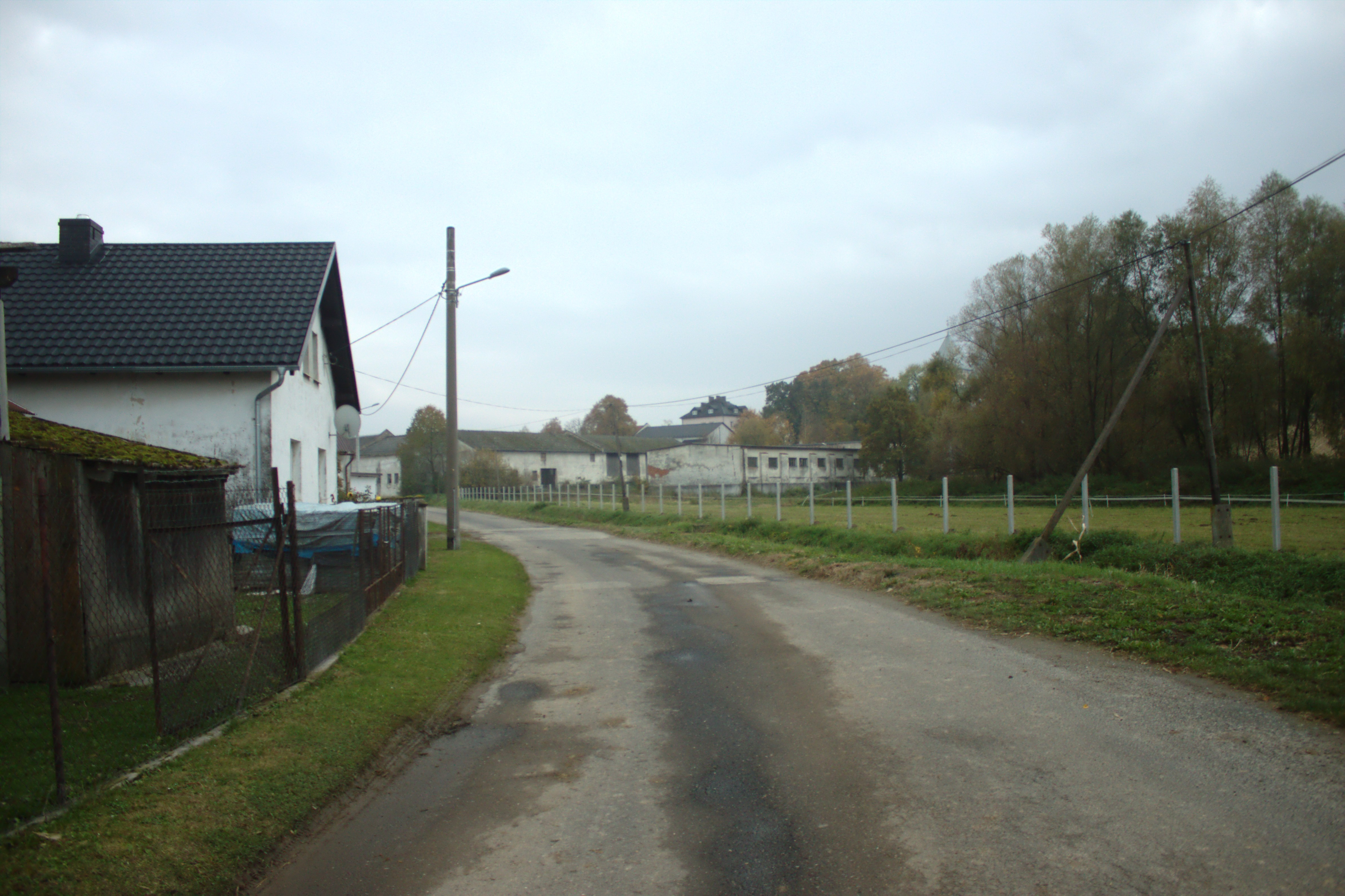
Farm
