= Mierzęcin =

Mierzęcin may refer to the following places:

- Mierzęcin, Lubusz Voivodeship (west Poland)
- Mierzęcin, Pułtusk County in Masovian Voivodeship (east-central Poland)
- Mierzęcin, Sierpc County in Masovian Voivodeship (east-central Poland)
- Mierzęcin, Gmina Pawłowiczki in Opole Voivodeship (south-west Poland)
- Mierzęcin, Gmina Polska Cerekiew in Opole Voivodeship (south-west Poland)
- Mierzęcin, West Pomeranian Voivodeship (north-west Poland)
