= Kózki, Opole Voivodeship =

Kózki Koske
- Village
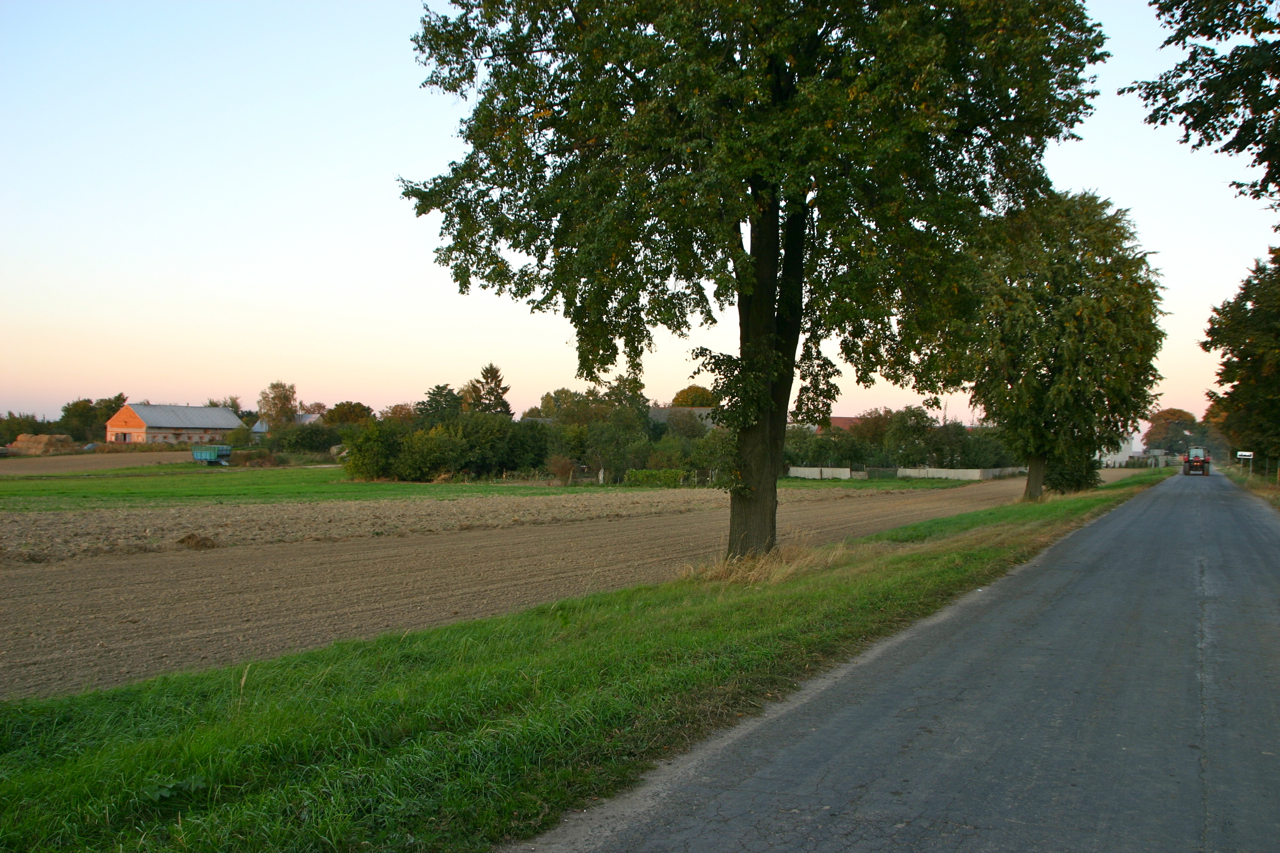

- Location within Poland
- Coordinates: 50°17′0″N 17°57′7″E
- Country: Poland
- Voivodeship: Opole
- County: Kędzierzyn-Koźle
- Gmina: Pawłowiczki

Kózki [ˈkuski], additional name in German: Koske, is a village in the administrative district of Gmina Pawłowiczki, within Kędzierzyn-Koźle County, Opole Voivodeship, in south-western Poland.

(see Territorial changes of Poland after World War II).

== Popular Media ==
The village of Kozki was the fictional setting for the 2010 film, The Shrine, though it was actually filmed in multiple locations in Ontario, Canada.
