= Grudynia Mała =

Grudynia Mała Klein Grauden
- Village
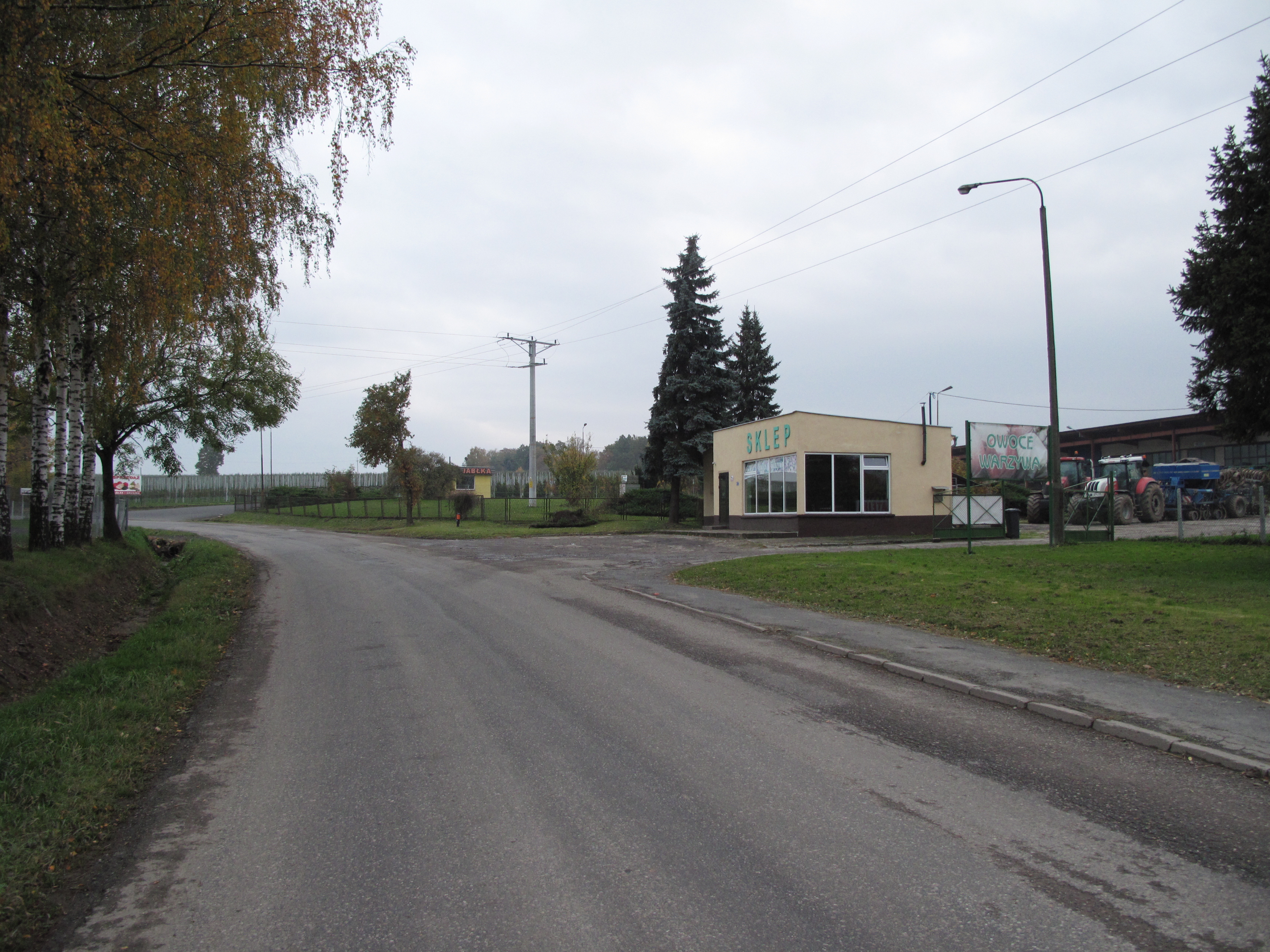
- Shop of the local business enterprise

- Location within Poland
- Coordinates: 50°14′N 17°57′E
- Country: Poland
- Voivodeship: Opole
- County: Kędzierzyn-Koźle
- Gmina: Pawłowiczki

Grudynia Mała [ɡruˈdɨɲa ˈmawa], additional name in German: Klein Grauden, is a village in the administrative district of Gmina Pawłowiczki, within Kędzierzyn-Koźle County, Opole Voivodeship, in south-western Poland.

== Gallery ==
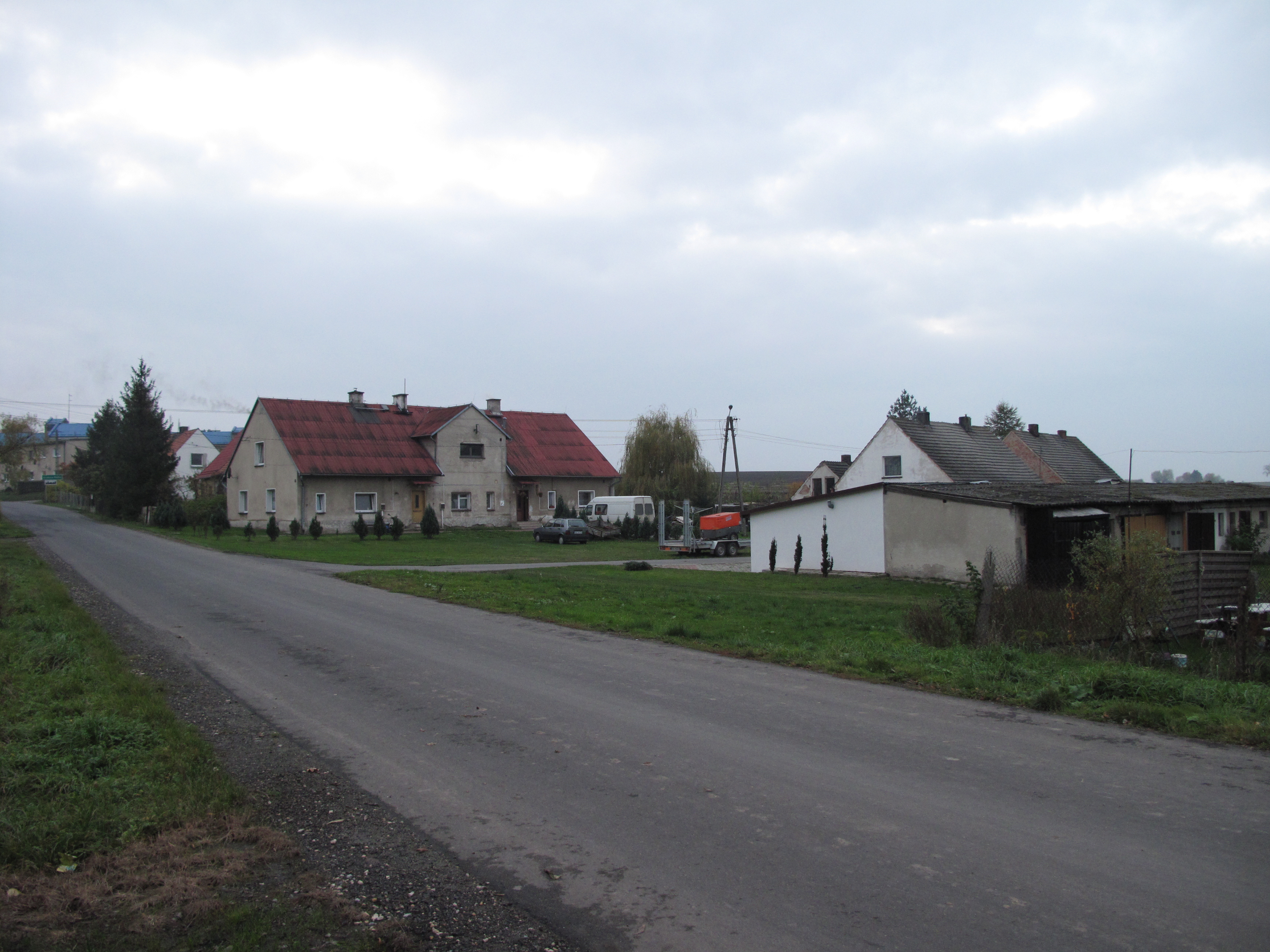
Village square

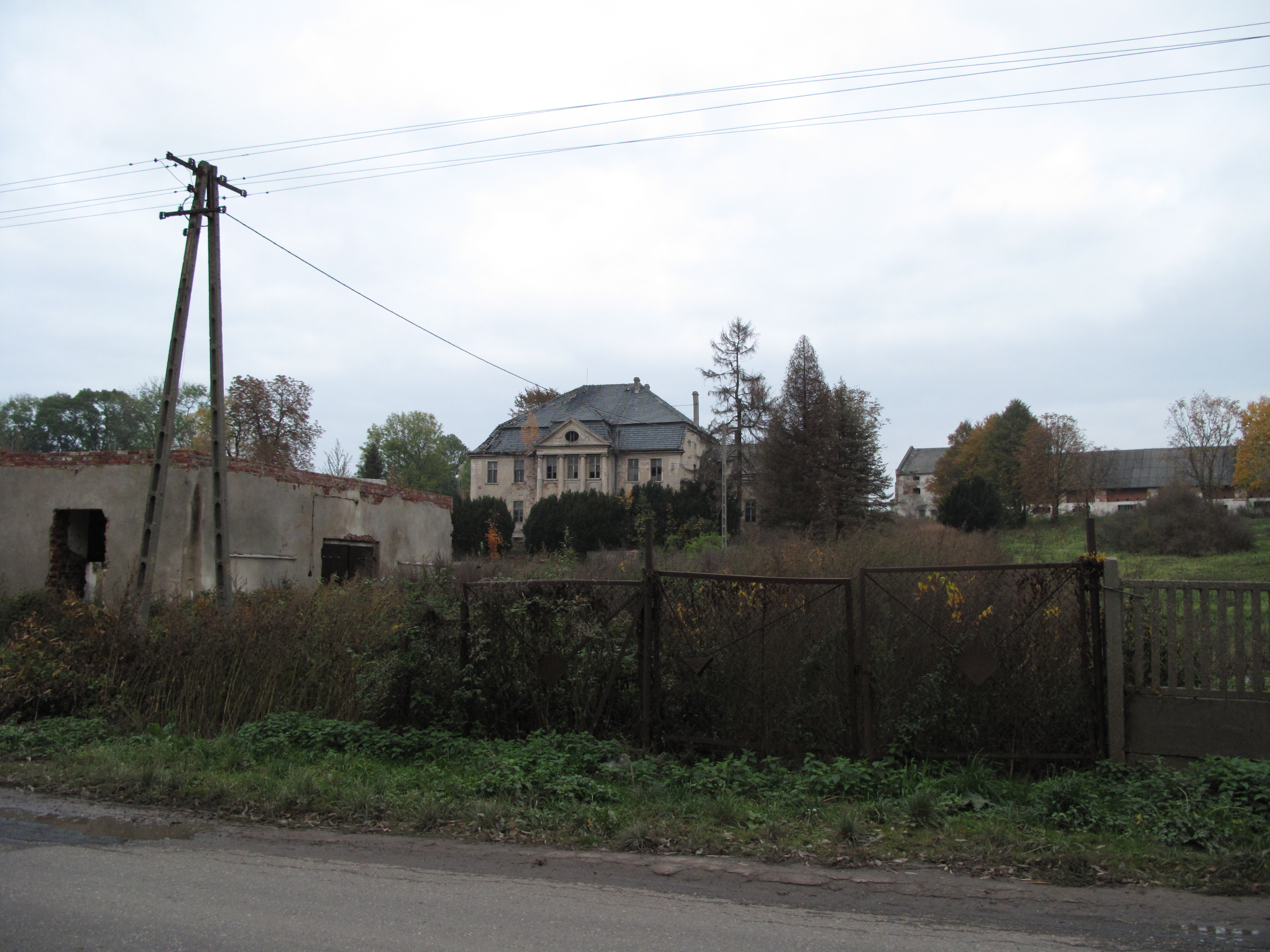
Garden

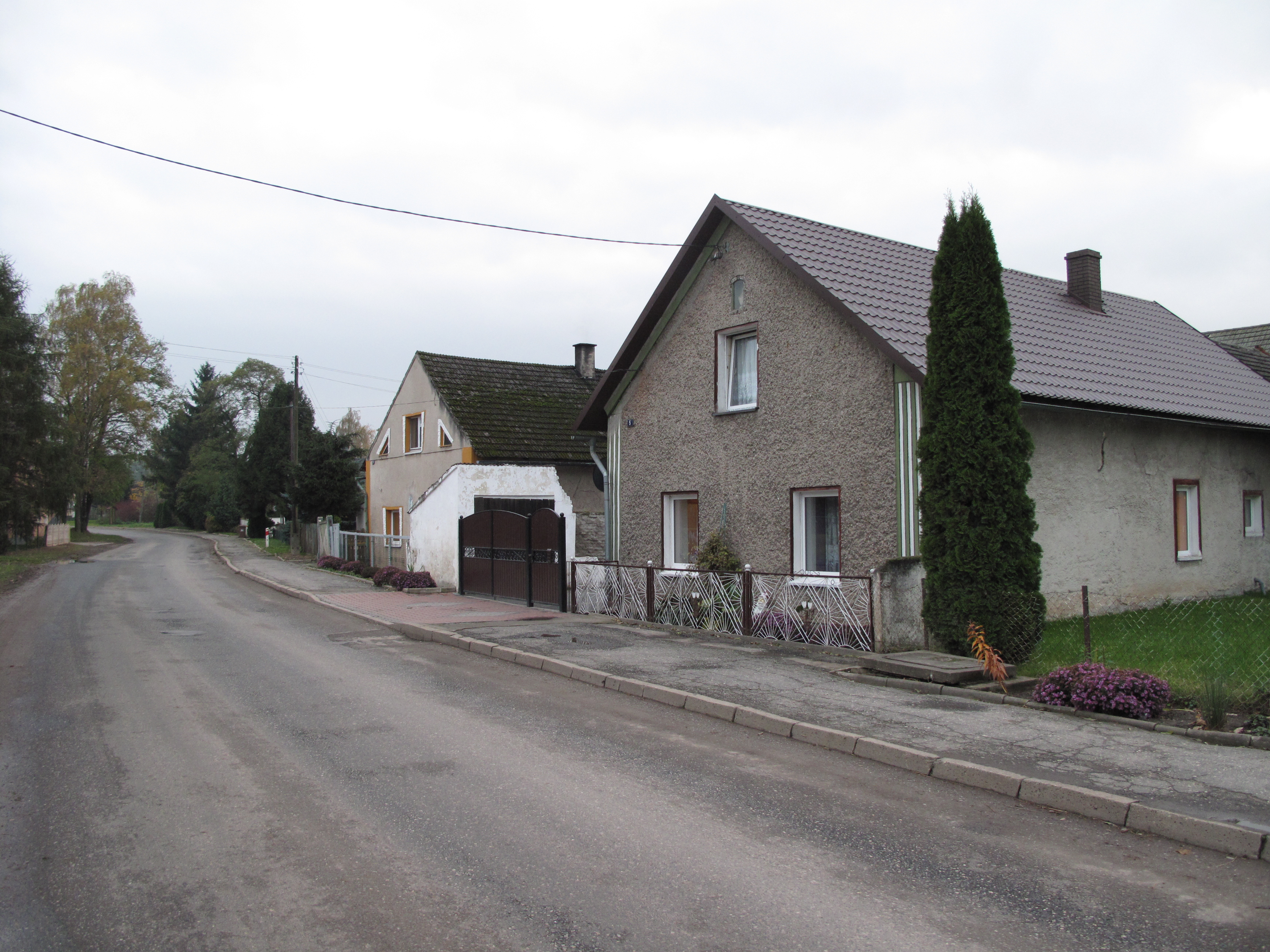
Street
