= Urbanowice =

- Village
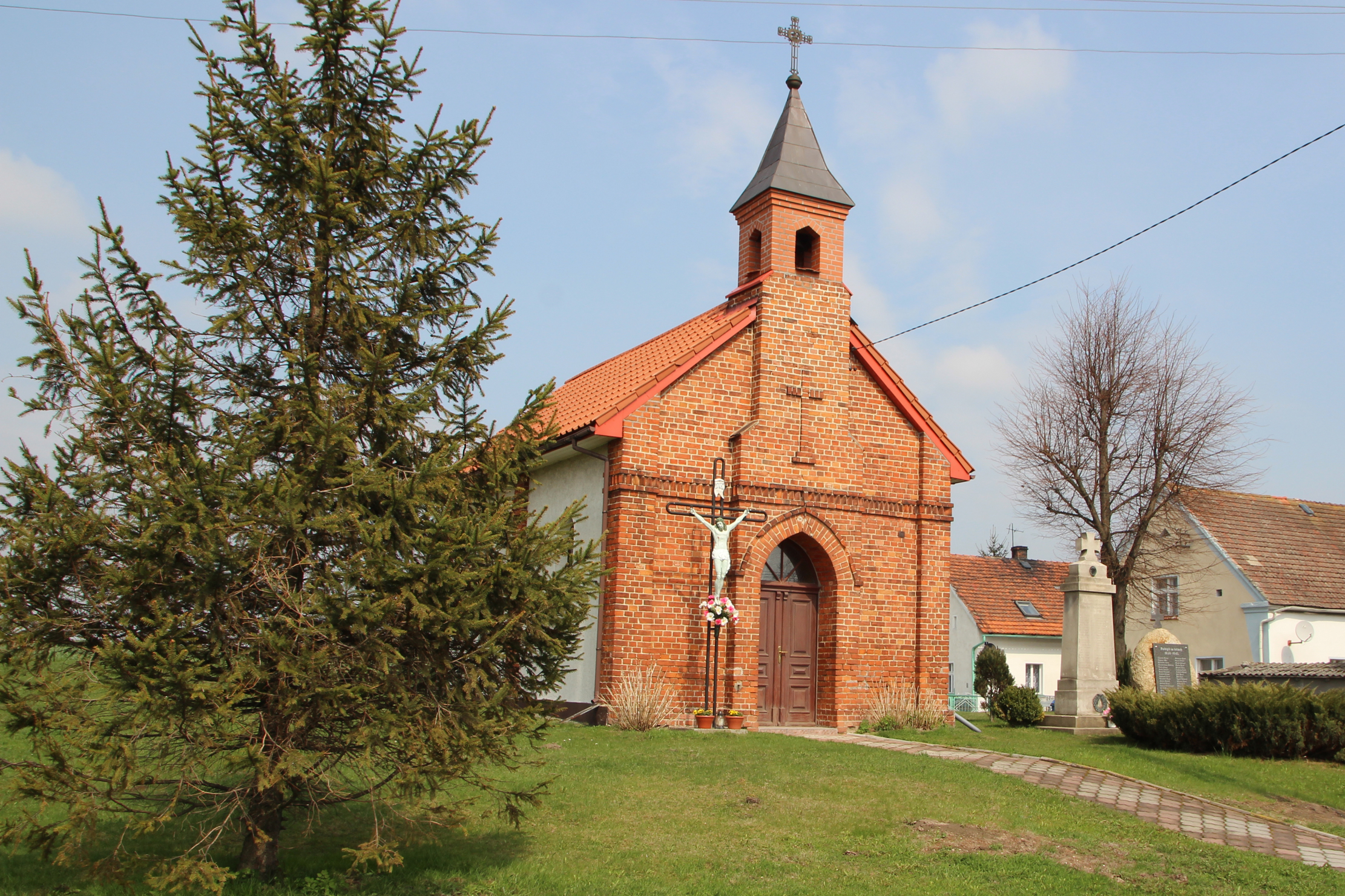

- Location within Poland
- Coordinates: 50°18′1″N 18°1′47″E
- Country: Poland
- Voivodeship: Opole
- County: Kędzierzyn-Koźle
- Gmina: Pawłowiczki
- Population: 660

Urbanowice [urbanɔˈvit͡sɛ] (German: Urbanowitz) is a village in the administrative district of Gmina Pawłowiczki, within Kędzierzyn-Koźle County, Opole Voivodeship, in south-western Poland.

== History ==
The village was first mentioned in a Latin document from 1223 issued by Wawrzyniec, Bishop of Wrocław, where it was recorded in the Latinized form "villa Urbani" (Polish: Urban's Village).

In 1845, the village had 75 houses, a castle, a school, a mill, and a brickyard.

By 1910, there were 106 houses and 703 inhabitants.

At the beginning of the 20th century, the village had a municipal seal with the inscription around the rim and in the field: GEMEINDE || Kreis Cosel O/S. In the field: URBANOWITZ (decorative ornament above and below the inscription).
