= Mierzęcin, Gmina Pawłowiczki =

Mierzęcin
- Village
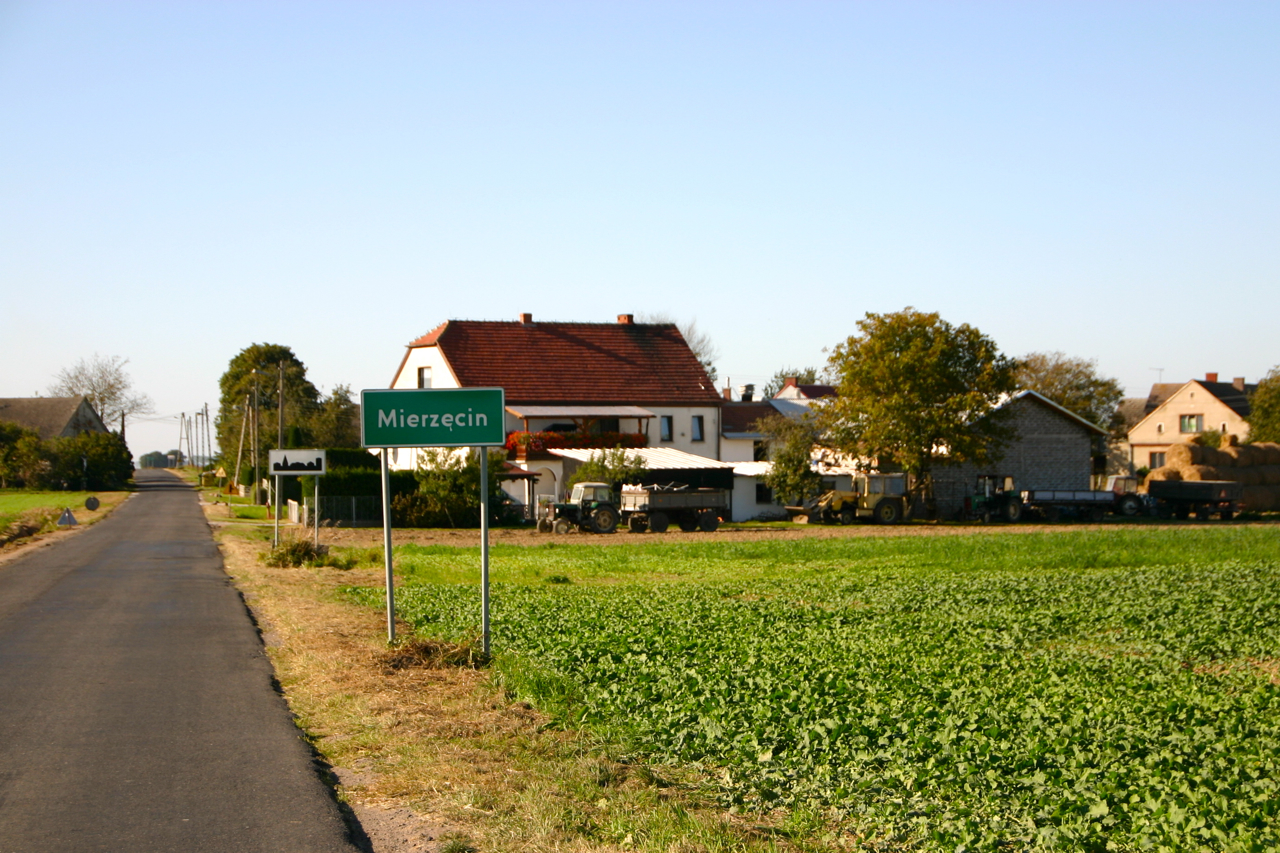

- Location within Poland
- Coordinates: 50°17′44″N 17°58′50″E
- Country: Poland
- Voivodeship: Opole
- County: Kędzierzyn-Koźle
- Gmina: Pawłowiczki

Mierzęcin [mjɛˈʐɛnt͡ɕin] (German: Mierzenzin) is a village in the administrative district of Gmina Pawłowiczki, within Kędzierzyn-Koźle County, Opole Voivodeship, in south-western Poland.
