= Radoszowy =

- Village
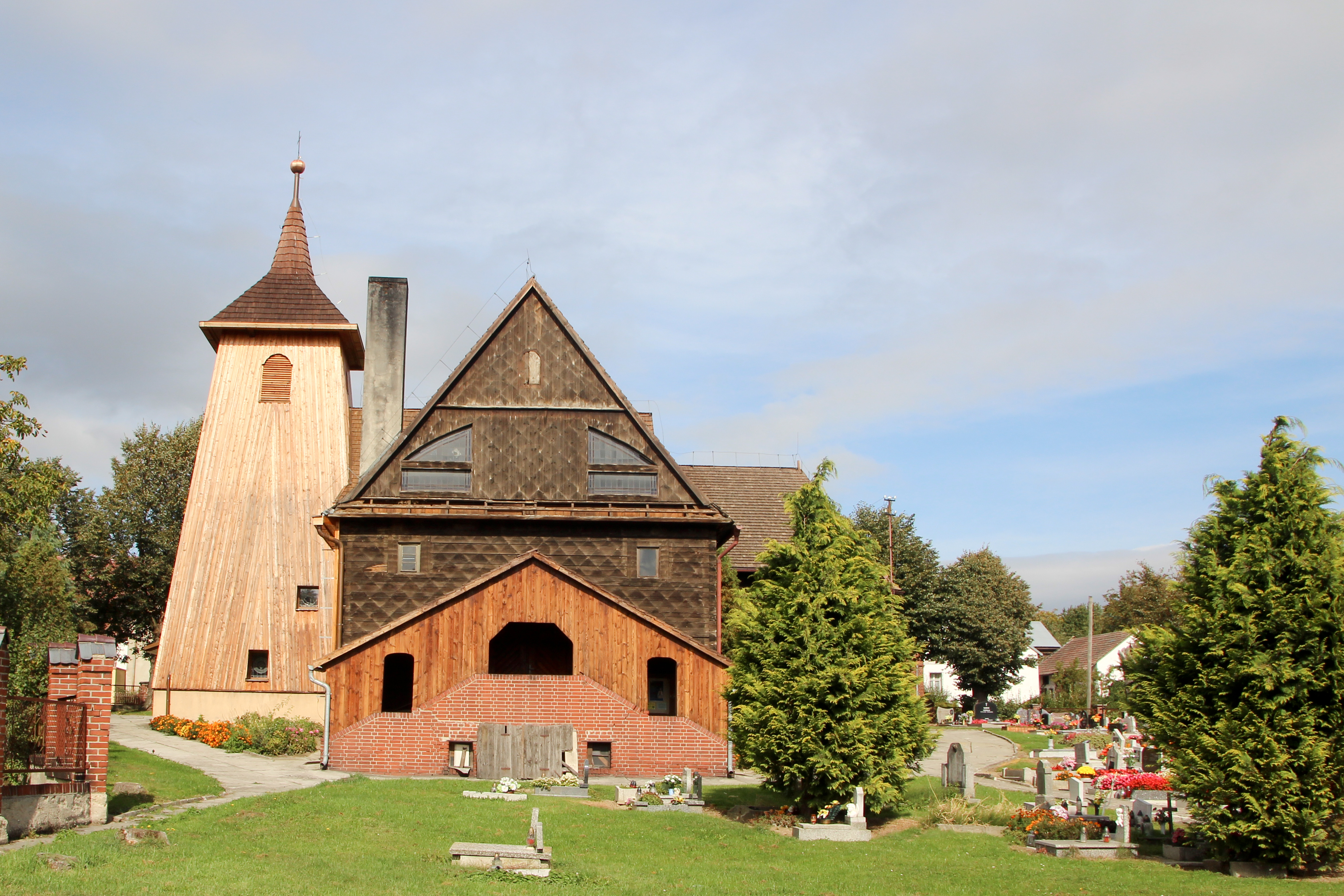
- Church

- Location within Poland
- Coordinates: 50°12′29″N 18°2′30″E
- Country: Poland
- Voivodeship: Opole
- County: Kędzierzyn-Koźle
- Gmina: Pawłowiczki

Radoszowy [radɔˈʂɔvɨ] (German: Radoschau) is a village in the administrative district of Gmina Pawłowiczki, within Kędzierzyn-Koźle County, Opole Voivodeship, in south-western Poland.
