= Gościęcin =

- Village
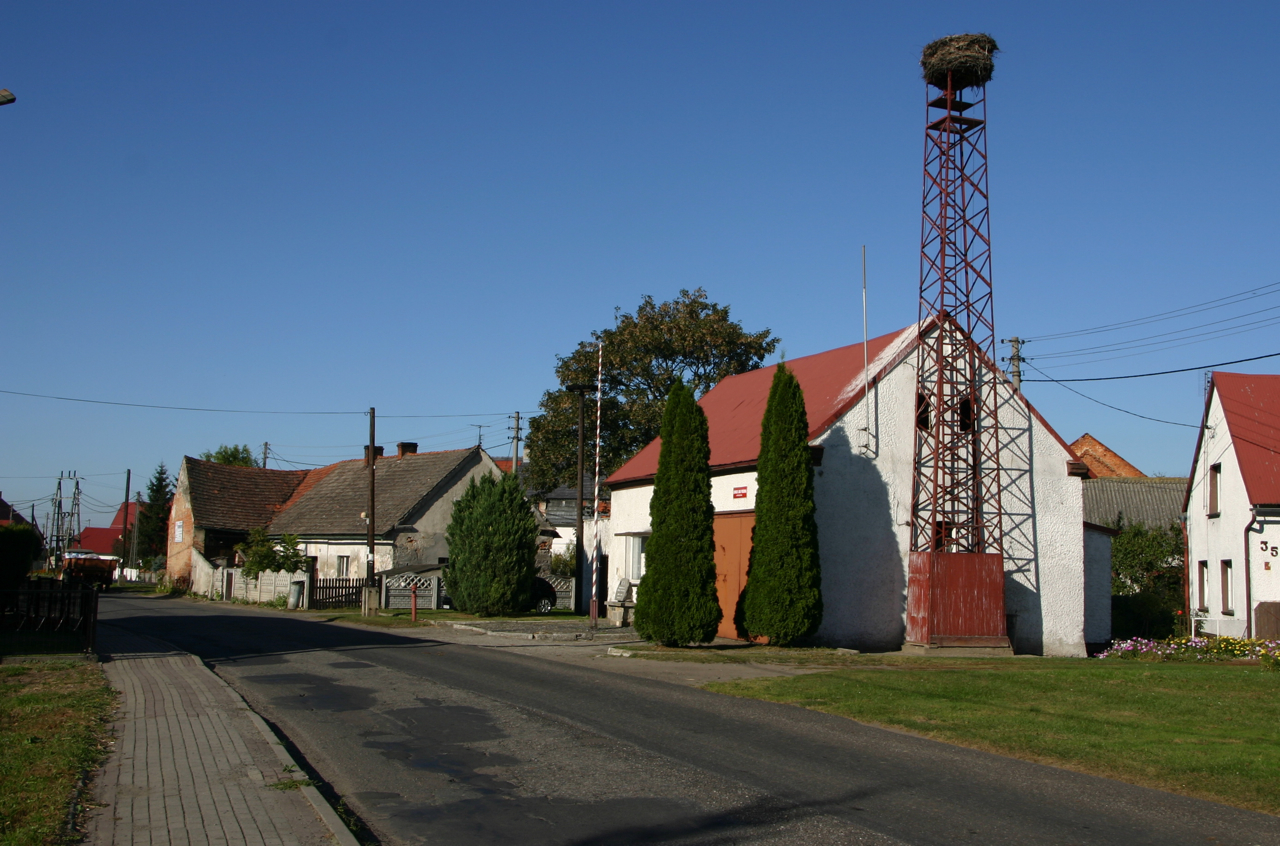

- Location within Poland
- Coordinates: 50°17′N 18°0′E
- Country: Poland
- Voivodeship: Opole
- County: Kędzierzyn-Koźle
- Gmina: Pawłowiczki

Gościęcin (Polish: [ɡɔɕˈt͡ɕɛɲt͡ɕin], German: Kostenthal) is a village in the administrative district of Gmina Pawłowiczki, within Kędzierzyn-Koźle County, Opole Voivodeship, in south-western Poland.

The cyclo-cross race Bryksy Cross is held in Gościęcin.
