= Gmina Pawłowiczki =

Gmina Pawłowiczki Pawłowiczki Commune
- Gmina
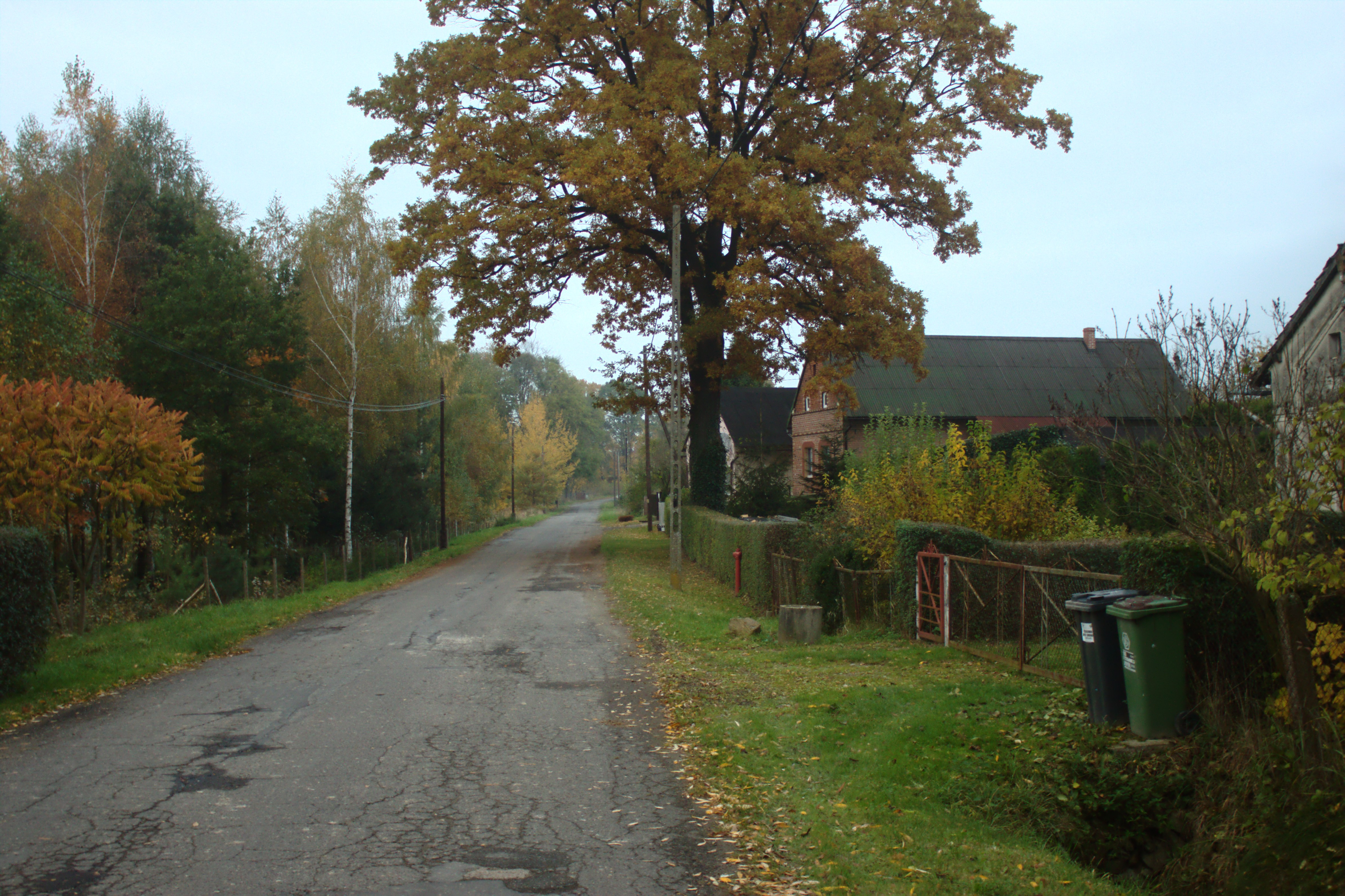
- Road in Milice

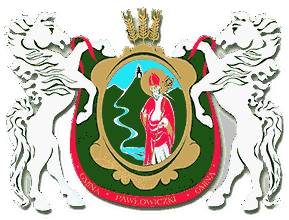
- Flag Coat of arms
- Interactive map of Gmina Pawłowiczki
- Coordinates (Pawłowiczki): 50°15′N 18°3′E
- Country: Poland
- Voivodeship: Opole
- County: Kędzierzyn-Koźle
- Seat: Pawłowiczki

Area
  - Total: 153.58 km^{2} (59.30 sq mi)

Population (2019-06-30)
  - Total: 7,477
  - Density: 48.68/km^{2} (126.1/sq mi)
- Website: http://www.pawlowiczki.pl

Gmina Pawłowiczki is a rural gmina (administrative district) in Kędzierzyn-Koźle County, Opole Voivodeship, in southwestern Poland. Its seat is the village of Pawłowiczki, which lies approximately 16 kilometres (10 mi) southwest of Kędzierzyn-Koźle and 47 km (29 mi) south of the regional capital Opole. Until 1945, Pawlowiczki was seat of the Moravian Brethren's Congregation Gnadenfeld (Gracefield) and from 1818 to 1922 seat of their theological seminary.

The gmina covers an area of 153.58 square kilometres (59.3 sq mi), and as of 2019 its total population is 7,477.

== Villages ==
Gmina Pawłowiczki contains the villages and settlements of Borzysławice, Chrósty, Dobieszów, Dobrosławice, Gościęcin, Grodzisko, Grudynia Mała, Grudynia Wielka, Jakubowice, Karchów, Kózki, Ligota Wielka, Maciowakrze, Mierzęcin, Milice, Naczęsławice, Ostrożnica, Pawłowiczki, Przedborowice, Radoszowy, Trawniki, Ucieszków and Urbanowice.

== Neighbouring gminas ==
Gmina Pawłowiczki is bordered by the gminas of Baborów, Głogówek and Głubczyce.

== Gallery ==
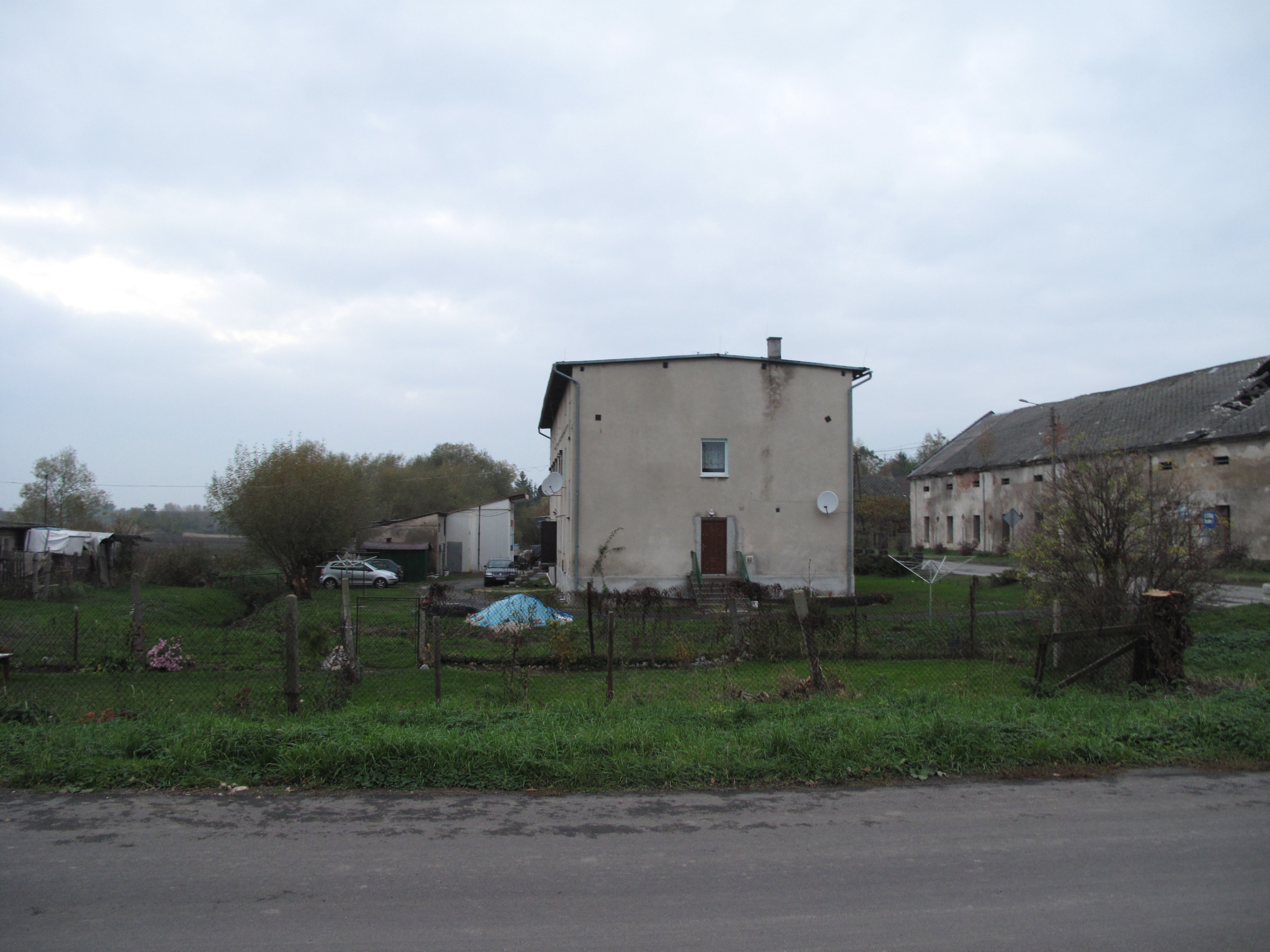
House in Grudynia Mała
