= Ostrożnica =

Ostrożnica Ostrosnitz
- Village
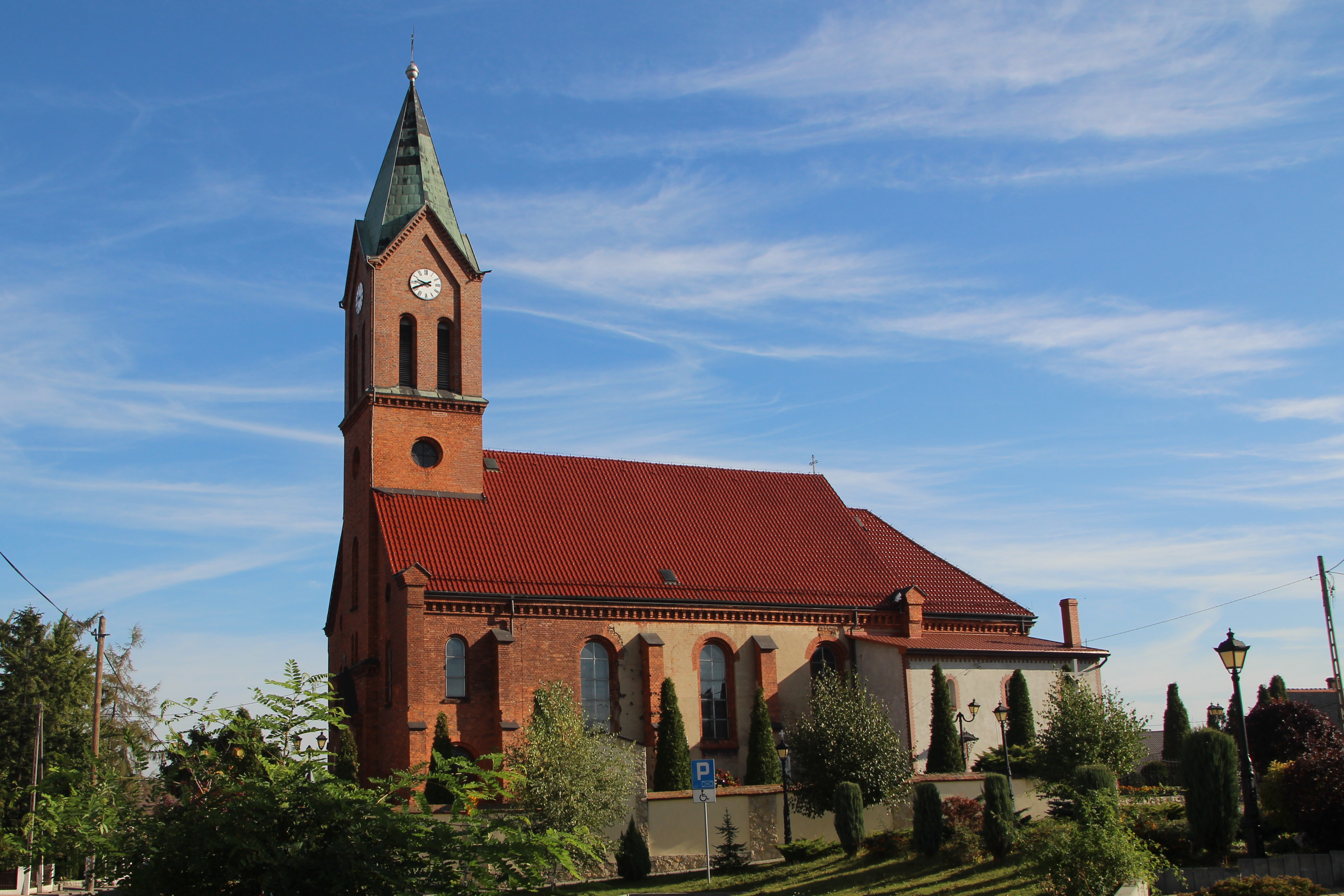
- Church

- Location within Poland
- Coordinates: 50°14′38″N 18°4′59″E
- Country: Poland
- Voivodeship: Opole
- County: Kędzierzyn-Koźle
- Gmina: Pawłowiczki
- Population (approx.): 1,000

Ostrożnica [ɔstrɔʐˈnit͡sa], additional name in German: Ostrosnitz, is a village in the administrative district of Gmina Pawłowiczki, within Kędzierzyn-Koźle County, Opole Voivodeship, in south-western Poland.
