= Milice, Opole Voivodeship =

Milice
- Village
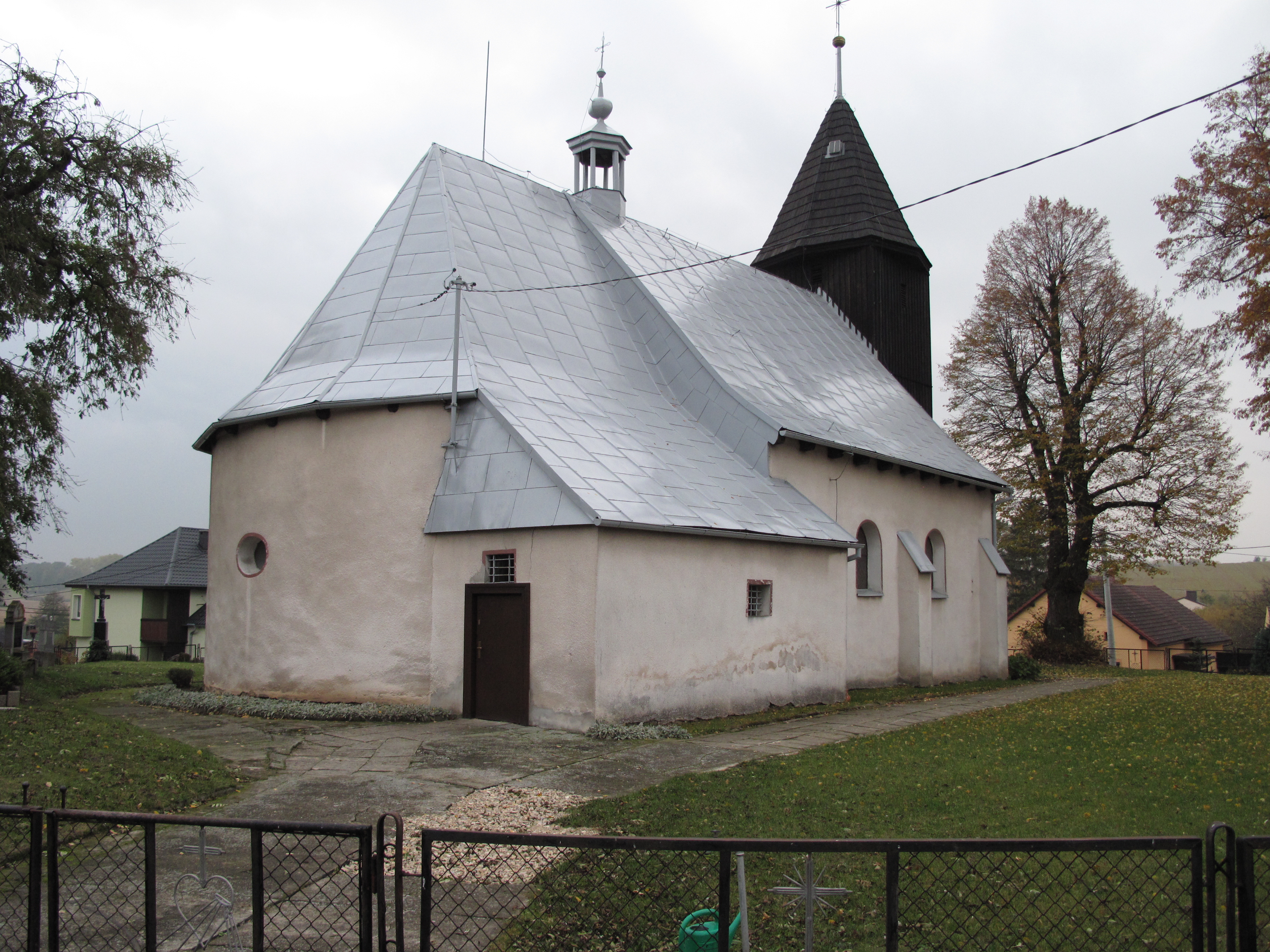
- Church of St. Martin

- Location within Poland
- Coordinates: 50°15′N 17°55′E
- Country: Poland
- Voivodeship: Opole
- County: Kędzierzyn-Koźle
- Gmina: Pawłowiczki

Milice [miˈlit͡sɛ] (German: Militsch) is a village in the administrative district of Gmina Pawłowiczki, within Kędzierzyn-Koźle County, Opole Voivodeship, in south-western Poland.

== Gallery ==
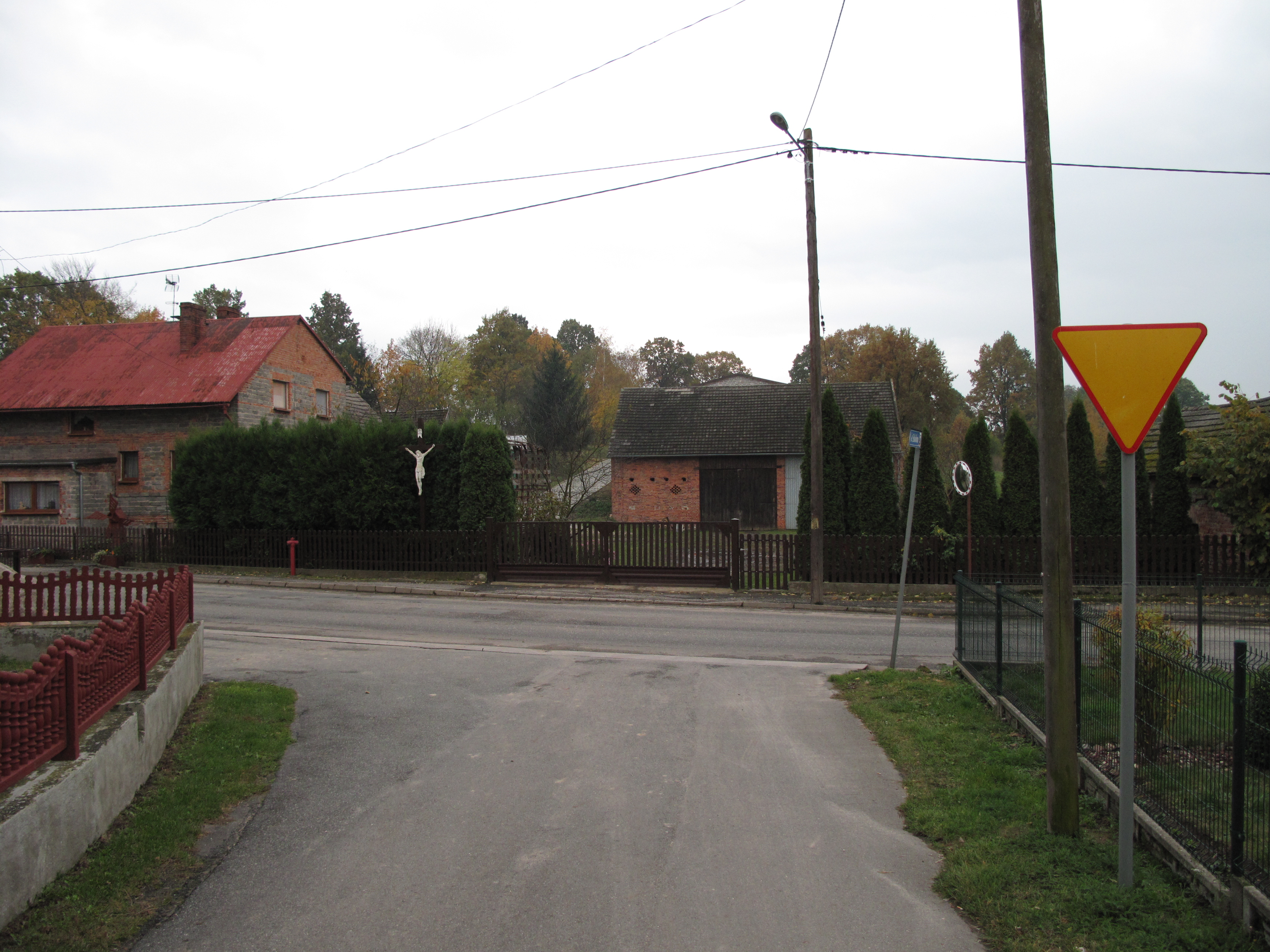
Crossroads

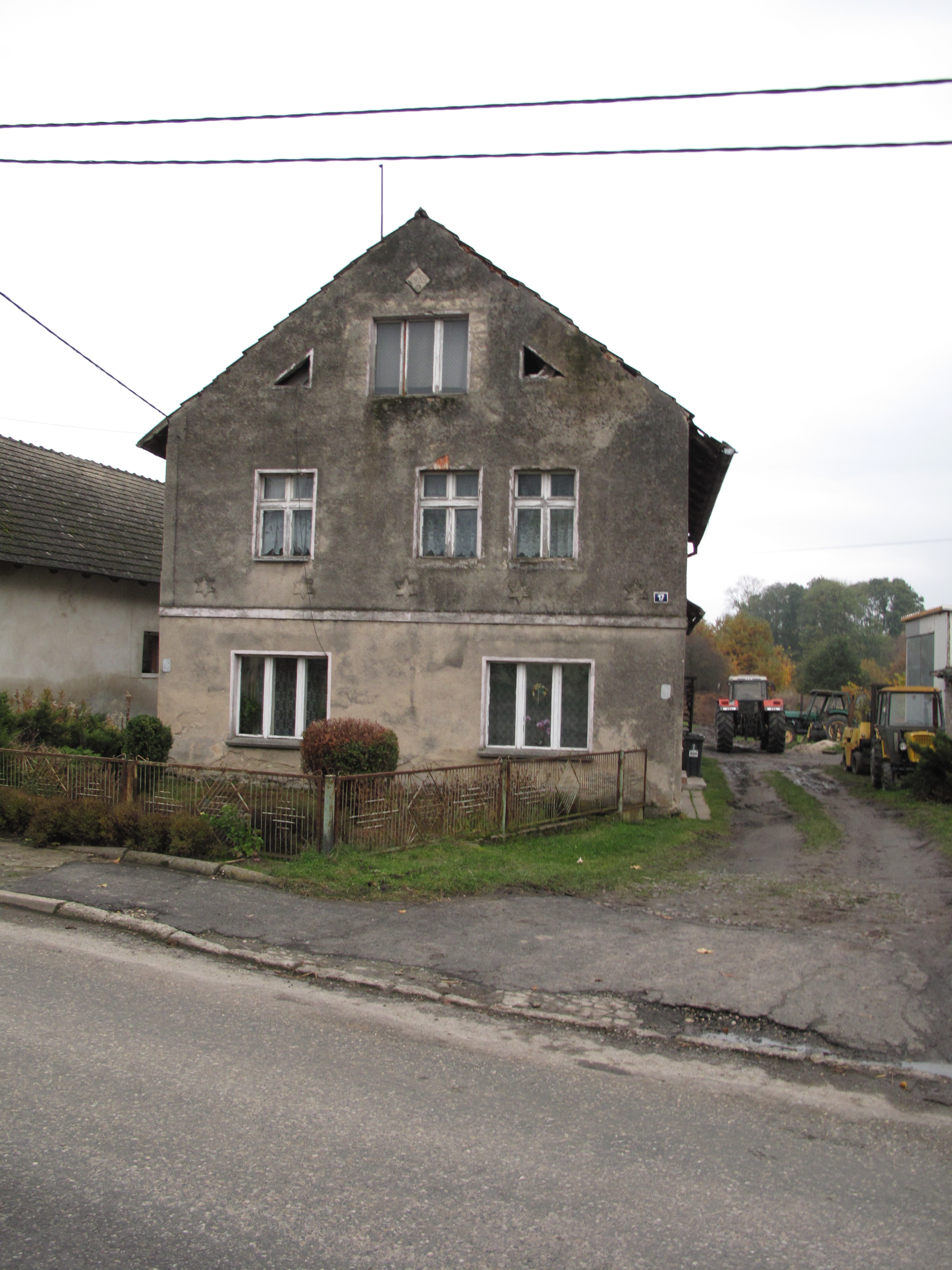
House

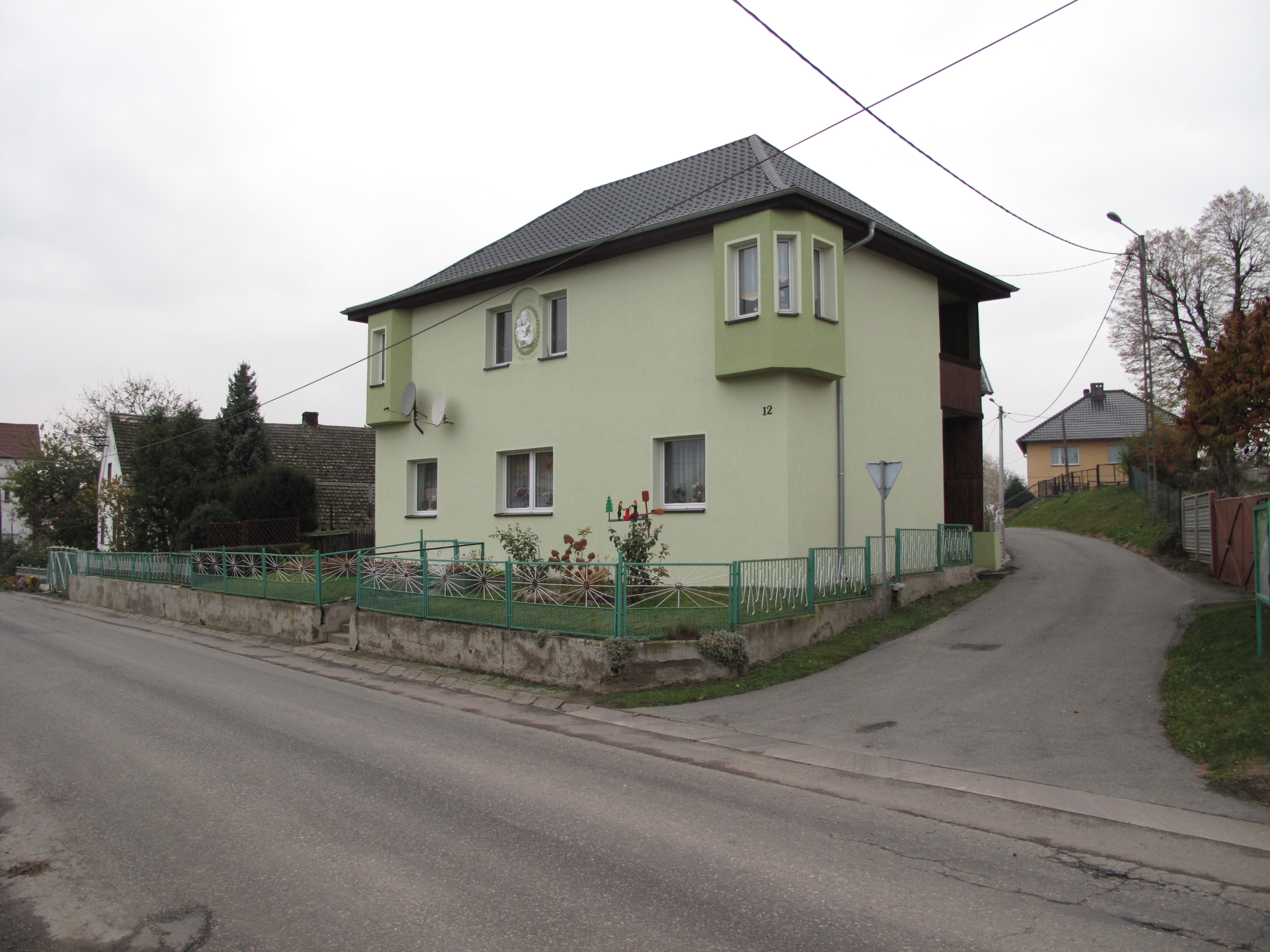
House
