= Walter Schulz (philosopher) =

German philosopher

Walter Schulz (18 November 1912, in Gnadenfeld/Oberschlesien – 12 June 2000, in Tübingen) was a German philosopher.

Schulz studied classical philology, philosophy and protestant theology at the University of Marburg, University of Breslau and University of Leipzig.

After being seriously wounded as a soldier in World War II, Schulz took his doctorate in 1944 with Hans-Georg Gadamer in Leipzig, and habilitated in 1950 in Heidelberg.

Schulz was appointed a professor at the University of Tübingen in 1955. Offered the chair of Martin Heidegger at Freiburg im Breisgau in 1958, he refused. Until his retirement in 1978, he was one of the Tübingen scholars with the largest audience.

== Publications (in German) ==
- Die Vollendung des Deutschen Idealismus in der Spätphilosophie Schellings (1955)
- Der Gott der neuzeitlichen Metaphysik (1957)
- Wittgenstein. Die Negation der Philosophie (1967)
- Philosophie in der veränderten Welt (1972)
- Ich und Welt (1979)
- Metaphysik des Schwebens (1985)
- Grundprobleme der Ethik (1989)
- Subjektivität im nachmetaphysischen Zeitalter (1992)
- Der gebrochene Weltbezug (1994)
