= Pawłowiczki =

- Village
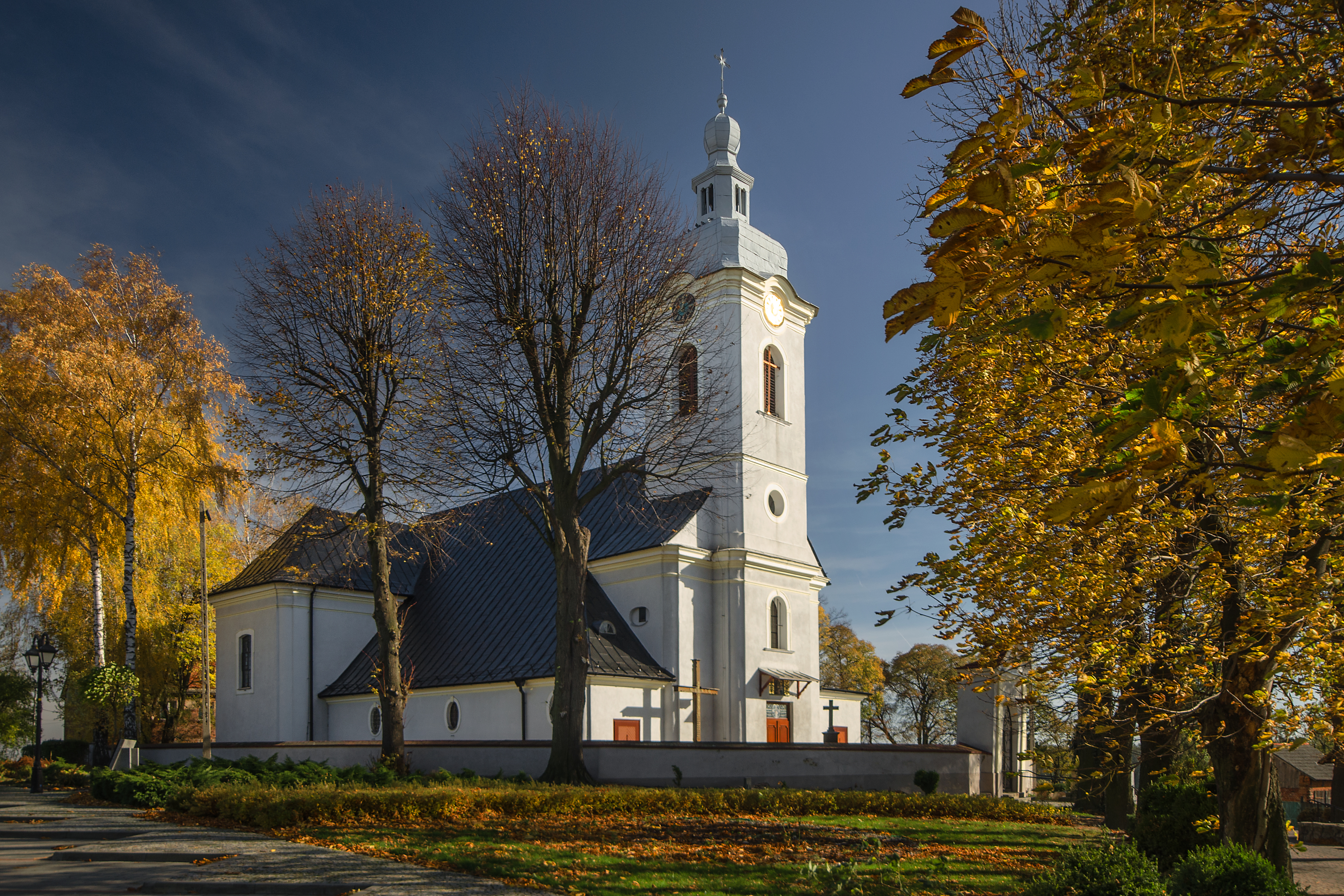
- Church of Saints Andrew and James

- Location within Poland
- Coordinates: 50°15′N 18°3′E
- Country: Poland
- Voivodeship: Opole
- County: Kędzierzyn-Koźle
- Gmina: Pawłowiczki

Population
  - Total: 1,300
- Website: http://www.pawlowiczki.pl

Pawłowiczki [pavwɔˈvit͡ʂki] (German: Pawlowitzke) is a village in Kędzierzyn-Koźle County, Opole Voivodeship, in south-western Poland. It is the seat of the gmina (administrative district) called Gmina Pawłowiczki.

Founded by the Moravian Brethren in 1743, it was for a century the site of their theological seminary.

== Notable residents ==
- Walter Schulz (1912-2000), German philosopher
