= Kędzierzyn-Koźle County =

Kędzierzyn-Koźle County Powiat kędzierzyńsko-kozielski
- County
- Flag Coat of arms

- Location within the voivodeship
- Coordinates (Kędzierzyn-Koźle): 50°21′N 18°12′E
- Country: Poland
- Voivodeship: Opole
- Seat: Kędzierzyn-Koźle
- Gminas: Total 6 (incl. 1 urban): Kędzierzyn-Koźle; Gmina Bierawa; Gmina Cisek; Gmina Pawłowiczki; Gmina Polska Cerekiew; Gmina Reńska Wieś

Area
  - Total: 625.28 km^{2} (241.42 sq mi)

Population (2019-06-30)
  - Total: 94,135
  - Density: 150.55/km^{2} (389.92/sq mi)
  - Urban: 60,852
  - Rural: 33,283
- Car plates: OK
- Website: www.powiat.kedzierzyn-kozle.pl

Kędzierzyn-Koźle County (Polish: powiat kędzierzyńsko-kozielski) is a unit of territorial administration and local government (powiat) in Opole Voivodeship, south-western Poland. It came into being on January 1, 1999, as a result of the Polish local government reforms passed in 1998. Its administrative seat and only town is Kędzierzyn-Koźle, which lies 40 kilometres (25 mi) south-east of the regional capital Opole.

The county covers an area of 625.28 square kilometres (241.4 sq mi). As of 2019 its total population is 94,135, out of which the population of Kędzierzyn-Koźle is 60,852 and the rural population is 33,283.

== Neighbouring counties ==
Kędzierzyn-Koźle County is bordered by Strzelce County to the north, Gliwice County to the east, Racibórz County to the south, Głubczyce County and Prudnik County to the west, and Krapkowice County to the north-west.

== Administrative division ==
The county is subdivided into six gminas (one urban and five rural). These are listed in the following table, in descending order of population.

Gmina	Type	Area (km^{2})	Population (2019)	Seat
Kędzierzyn-Koźle	urban	123.4	60,852	
Gmina Reńska Wieś	rural	97.9	8,251	Reńska Wieś
Gmina Bierawa	rural	119.2	7,910	Bierawa
Gmina Pawłowiczki	rural	153.6	7,477	Pawłowiczki
Gmina Cisek	rural	70.9	5,624	Cisek
Gmina Polska Cerekiew	rural	60.9	4,021	Polska Cerekiew
