= Erich Lassota von Steblau =

Habsburg diplomat (c. 1550/55 – 1616)

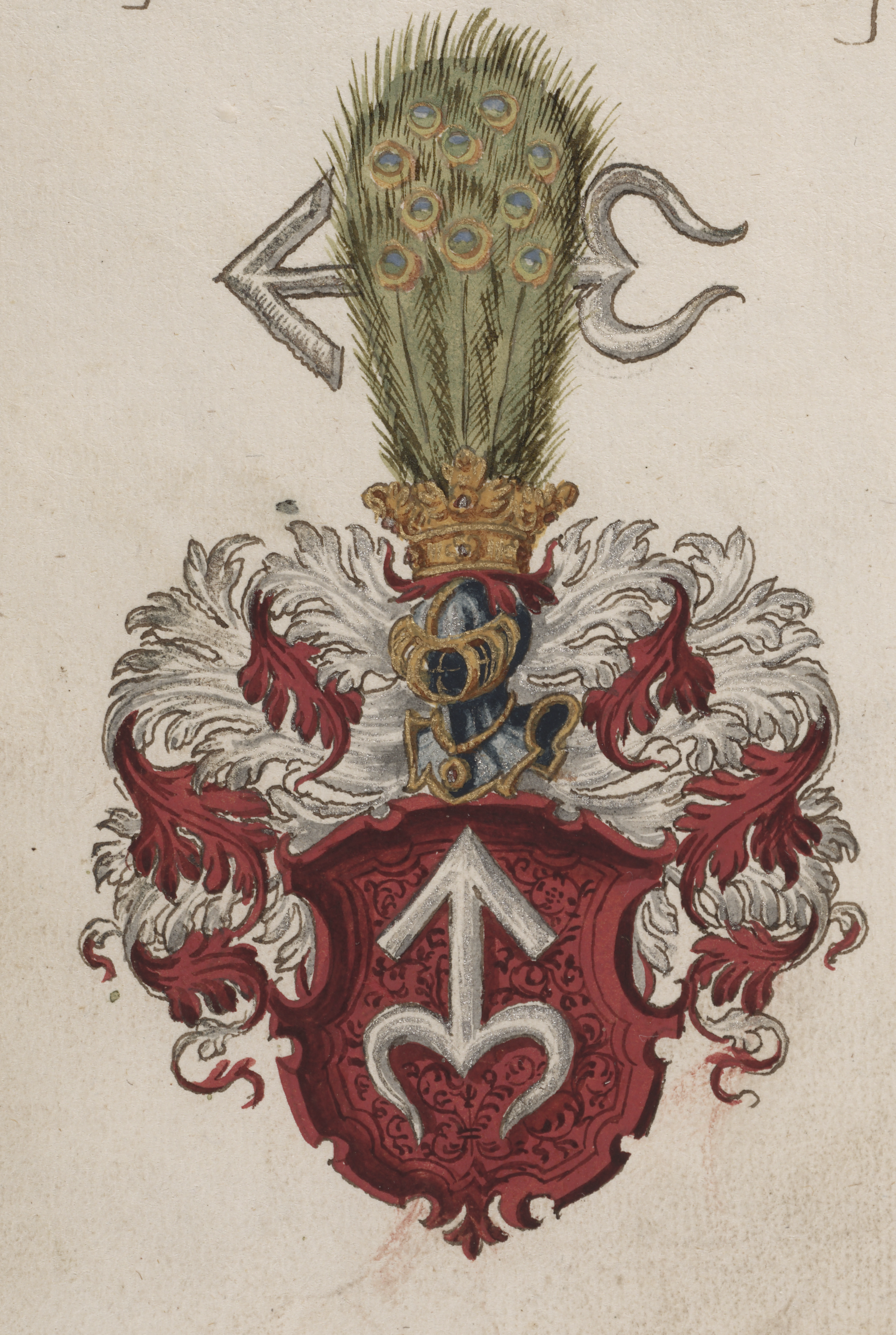
- The coat of arms of Erich Lassota von Steblau, as found in the album amicorum of Daniel Hermann
- Born: c. 1550–1555; Probably Błażejowice
- Died: 1616; Košice
- Occupations: Soldier, Diplomat, Diarist

Erich Lassota von Steblau (c. 1550/55 – 1616) was a diplomat and military officer from Silesia. Born in an aristocratic family, he studied at the University of Padua before joining the War of the Portuguese Succession on the side of King Philip II of Spain. After the war, he became employed by Archduke Maximilian of Austria, and accompanied the archduke in his failed attempt to obtain the Polish throne. Lassota accompanied Maximilian in captivity, until he could return to his family estate in 1590. He was then sent on a mission to try to form an alliance with Russia against Maximilian's Swedish rivals but failed and was again taken prisoner. He remained in Swedish captivity for three years. Following this, he was again sent on a mission by Maximilian, this time successful, to the Zaporozhian Cossacks in present-day Ukraine, in order to convince the Cossacks to join the Imperial forces in its War against the Ottoman Empire. After his return, Lassota was promoted to Inspector General of Upper Hungary, a position he kept until the uprising of Stephen Bocskai in 1604, when his property was despoiled by the rebels. He continued to remain in Habsburg service, however, and in 1611, he was appointed to the Imperial Council. He died in 1616, in Košice.

Erich Lassota von Steblau left behind a diary, which has been preserved in the city library of Bautzen in Germany. The diary forms an important text source on the 16th-century history of the countries he visited. It was discovered in the 19th century and has since been published in modern German editions and also translated into Spanish, Portuguese, Russian, and Polish.

== Biography ==
=== Early life and the War of the Portuguese Succession ===
The exact date and place of birth of Erich Lassota von Steblau are unknown; it has been assumed that he was born around 1550–55 and very probably in Błażejowice (known as Bleischwitz in German) in Silesia, where his family's main estate was located. Throughout his life and many travels he would always return to the area around Głogówek (Oberglogau), his home region. He wrote his diary in a Silesian dialect of German, intermixed with Latin and Slavic words. He came from an old aristocratic family. Very little is known about his early life and his family; he had two brothers and his father died around 1573. His uncle, Nikolaus Lassota von Steblau, was chancellor of the Duchy of Opole and Racibórz from 1557.

Erich Lassota von Steblau received basic schooling in Görlitz (c. 1567) and in 1574–1576 he studied at the University of Padua in Italy. He then returned to his father's estate, but in 1579 set out to participate as a soldier in the War of the Portuguese Succession on the side of King Philip II of Spain as part of a regiment consisting of German-speaking nobles. He spent five years in the army, fighting in the Iberian peninsula as well as participating in the conquest of the Azores, before taking his leave in Italy in 1584.

=== Diplomatic missions ===
He then briefly returned to his estate, before entering the service of Emperor Rudolf II and one year later Rudolf's brother Archduke Maximilian, serving as an advisor specialised in Polish affairs. He thus participated in the failed attempt of Maximilian to secure the Polish crown for himself, acting as an escort to General Christoph von Teuffenbach and commanding the German troops under Maximilian's command. Following the Battle of Byczyna, Erich Lassota von Steblau followed Maximilian into captivity at Krasnystaw for two years. In reward for his faithful service, he was promoted to Lord High Steward by Maximilian.

Following their release in 1590, Erich Lassota von Steblau was sent on a covert mission to Moscow in order to try to establish an alliance with Russia against Maximilian's Swedish rivals. However, he was captured by Swedish forces close to Narva and brought to mainland Sweden, where he was interrogated personally by King John III and his brother, future King Charles IX. He would spend three years in Swedish captivity, before he could return to Silesia in early 1594 thanks to an intervention by Emperor Rudolf II.

Almost immediately, he was dispatched on another mission. He was appointed as Imperial envoy to the Zaporozhian Cossacks in present-day Ukraine, in order to attempt to convince the Cossacks to join the Imperial forces in its War against the Ottoman Empire and its Crimean Tatar allies. This time his mission was a success: the Cossacks were convinced to join the war and in the autumn of 1594 entered Moldavia with a force of 12,000 troops, under Imperial banners, with the aim of cutting the retreat of Tatar forces from Hungary. It constituted the largest Cossack incursion into Moldavia during the 16th century.

After his return from Ukraine later in 1594, Erich Lassota von Steblau was promoted to Inspector General of Upper Hungary. He kept this position until 1604, when the city of Košice was plundered during the uprising of Stephen Bocskai, and Erich Lassota von Steblau's property despoiled. He himself barely escaped alive. He continued to remain in Habsburg service, however, and in 1611, he was appointed to the Imperial Council. Archduke Maximilian noted in a letter the same year that he had served the Habsburg family diligently for 33 years. Erich Lassota von Steblau died in 1616, in Košice.

== Diary ==
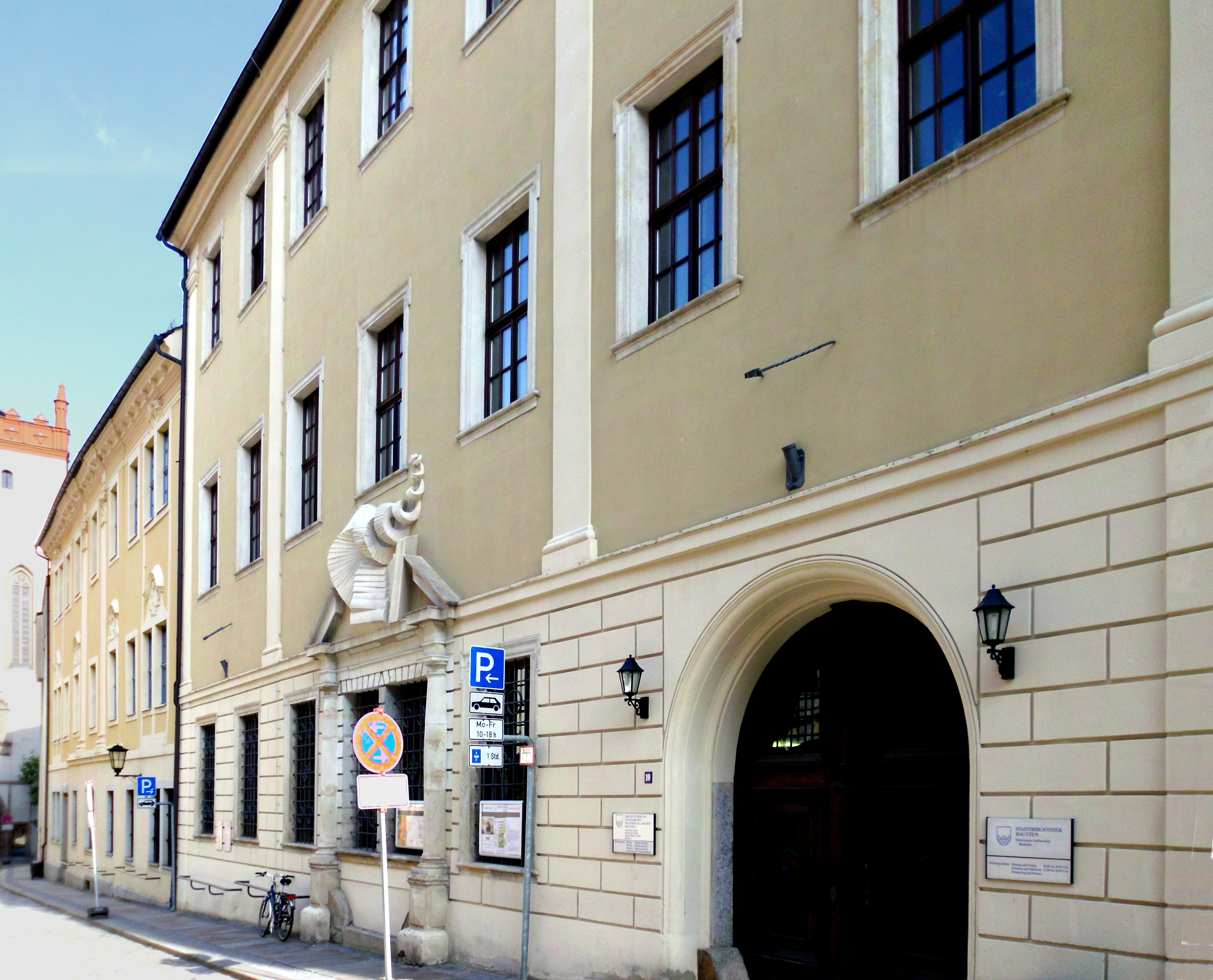
The city library of Bautzen, where the original manuscript of Lassota's diary is kept

Erich Lassota von Steblau kept a diary from 1573 until 1611 (with a gap 1595–1610) in which he made notes from his travels. The original manuscript of the diary is kept in the city library of Bautzen in Germany, where it forms part of collections donated by Hans von Gersdorff (1630–1692). The diary forms an important text source on the 16th-century history of the countries he visited. Notably, it is an important primary source on the Cossacks of Ukraine of the 16th century. The diary also contains one of the earliest descriptions of Stockholm, the capital of Sweden, by a foreigner. It also contains notes on many other locations within present-day Sweden, e.g. the Stones of Mora and the legend of Finn the Giant in Lund Cathedral.

The diary was rediscovered by Reinhold Schottin, librarian in Bautzen, and a first modern edition published in German by him in 1854. Subsequently, translations of the diary have been made into Russian, Spanish, Portuguese, and Polish.

== Legacy ==
Lassota is mentioned in a 1923 poem by Ukrainian neoclassical poet Mykola Zerov among other famous historical visitors to Kyiv.
