= Roszowice =

Roszowice Roschowitzdorf
- Village
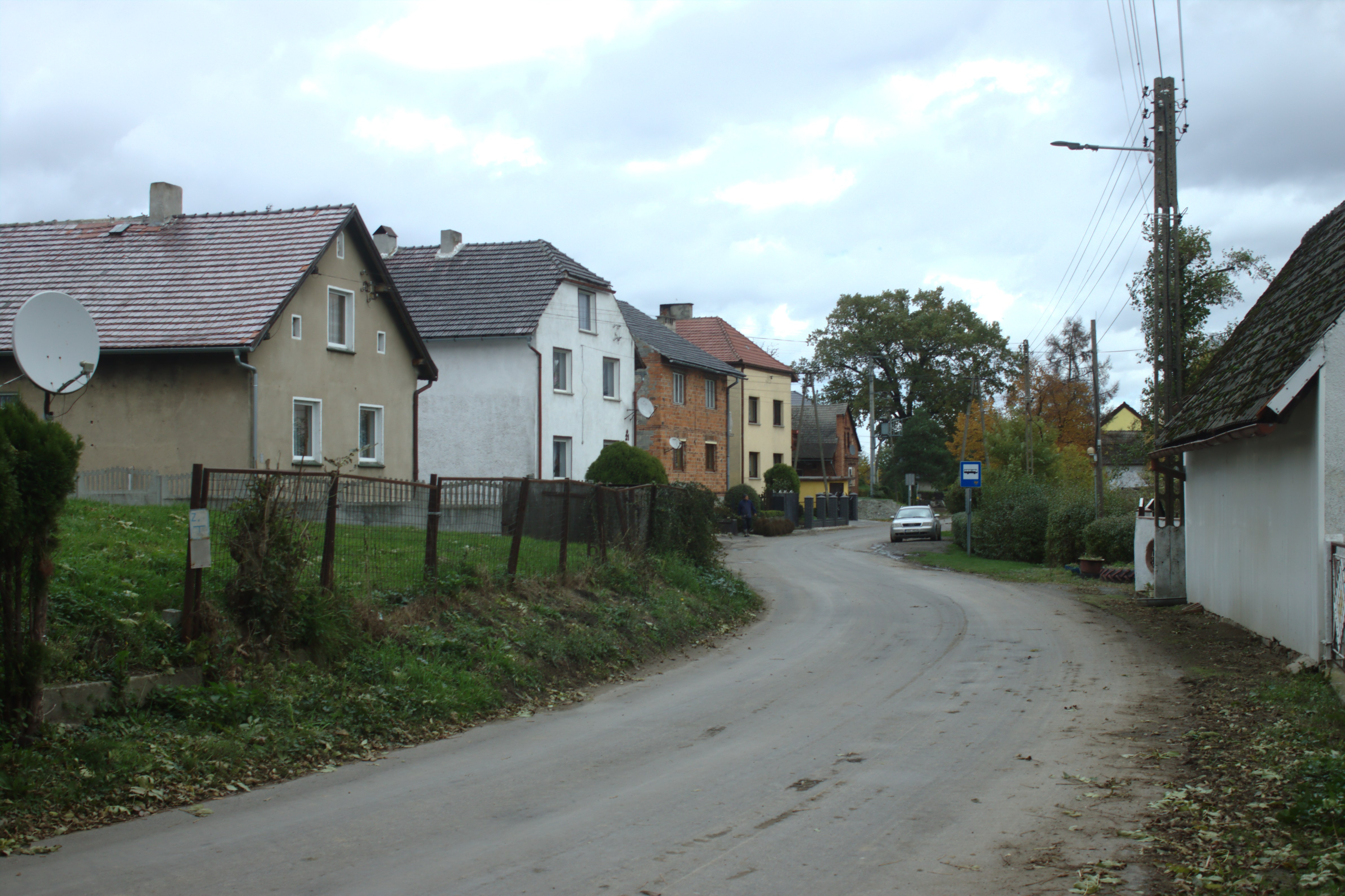
- Houses

- Location within Poland
- Coordinates: 50°14′10″N 18°12′20″E
- Country: Poland
- Voivodeship: Opole
- County: Kędzierzyn-Koźle
- Gmina: Cisek
- Population: 252
- Postal code: 47-253

Roszowice ([rɔʂɔˈvit͡sɛ], additional name in German: Roschowitzdorf) is a village in the administrative district of Gmina Cisek, within Kędzierzyn-Koźle County, Opole Voivodeship, in southern Poland.
