= Cisek =

Cisek Czissek
- Village
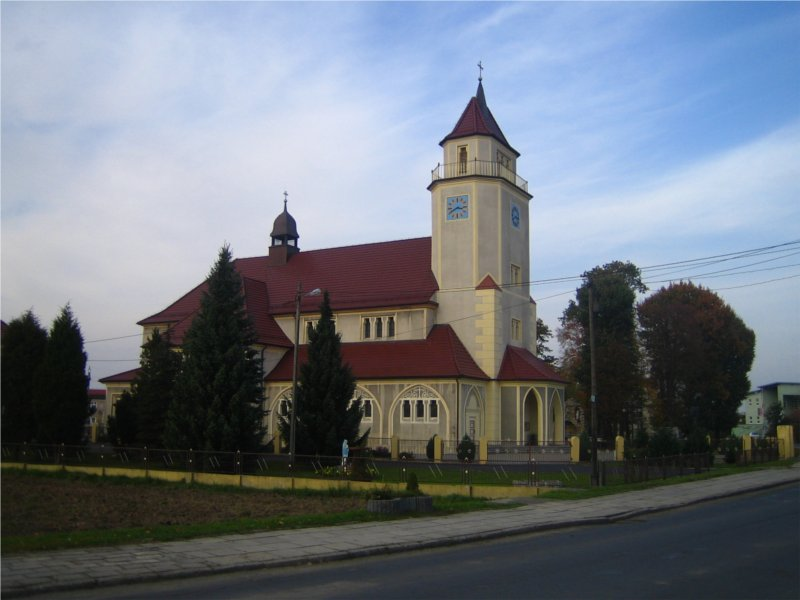
- The village's Neo-Gothic parish church, Visitation of the Blessed Virgin Mary, built in 1927
- Interactive map of Cisek
- Location within Poland
- Coordinates: 50°17′N 18°12′E
- Country: Poland
- Voivodeship: Opole
- County: Kędzierzyn-Koźle
- Gmina: Cisek

Population
  - Total: 1,485
- Postal code: 47-253
- Website: www.cisek.gmina.pl

Cisek (Polish: [ˈt͡ɕisɛk], additional name in German: Czissek) is an agricultural village in Kędzierzyn-Koźle County, Opole Voivodeship, in south-western Poland. It is the seat of the gmina (administrative district) called Gmina Cisek.

== History ==
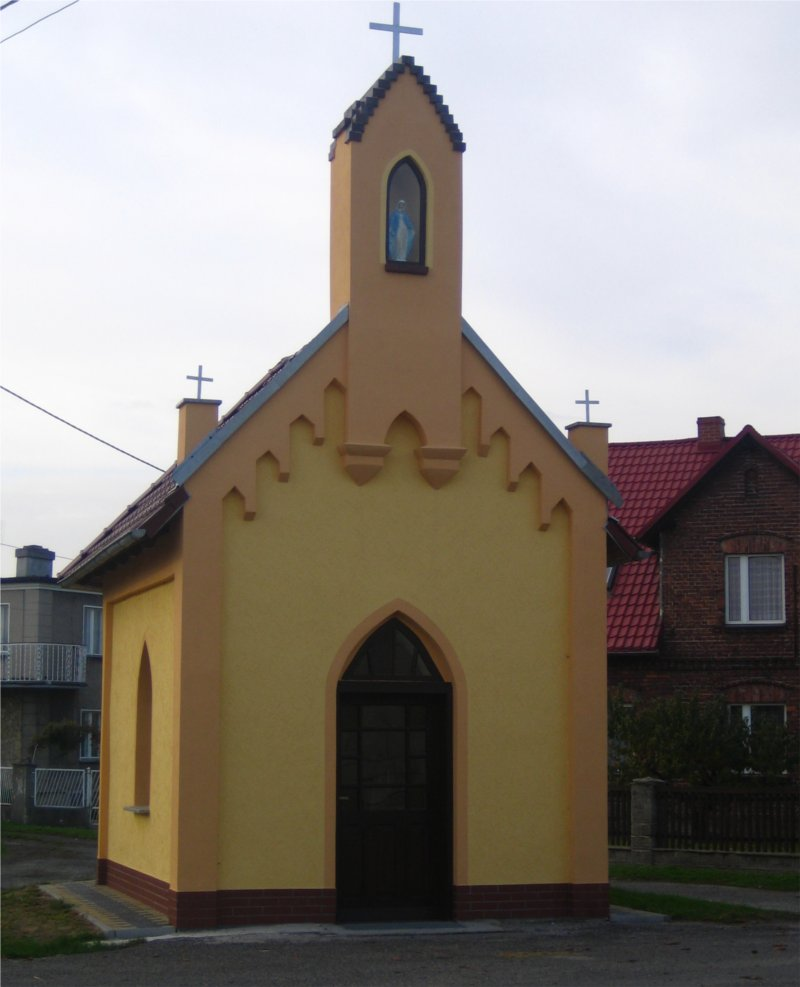
Wayside Chapel

In 1532, it was named as Czisky and Cisek. In 1830, the village had 564 residents and 138 houses. By 1845, it had grown to 760 inhabitants and 129 houses. A Roman Catholic school, founded in 1818, employed one teacher and one assistant teacher. In 1865, the total area of the village was 8.3 km^{2} (3.2 sq mi). According to the census of 1910, the village was inhabited by 1,206 Poles. In the census of 1925, the Polish language was listed as the native tongue of 901 villagers, German was only listed by 64 people, and 343 people were recorded as bilingual.

From 1925 to 1933, a Polish language public school functioned in the village. There was also a branch of the Polish-Catholic School Society. In 1937, the village caused an uproar in the Polish community of Germany due to the county authorities in Koźle denial of a license to suspend the village's newly acquired church tower bells. The bells had been funded by local Polish parishioners. The German authorities had stated that the tower was too weak to hang the heavy bells. Finally, the authorities agreed to suspend the bells after removing the Polish inscription from them which read, "Hail Mary, pray for us." The Union of Poles in Germany also registered two more cases of destruction of Polish inscriptions, which were placed on the roadside crosses, at this time.

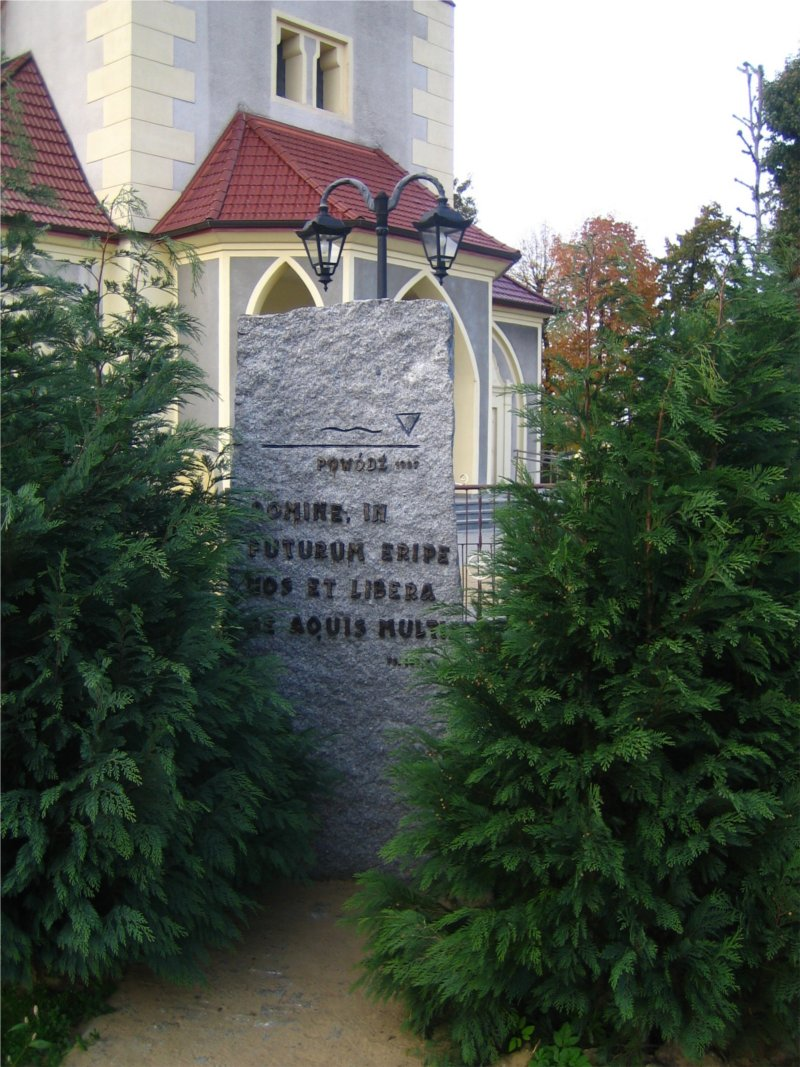
A stone in memory of the 1997 Millennium Flood.

In 1997 the village was heavily affected by the Millennium Flood. The flood destroyed nearly all the season's crops and many roads. The village is partnered with both Breitungen and Körperich in Germany.

== General statistics ==
- Population: 1,485
- Population density: 280 people/km^{2}
- Area: 5.3 km^{2} (2.0 sq mi)
  - Forests and forest land: 2 km^{2} (0.77 sq mi)

== Population trends ==
Year	Population
1880	1,070 people
1933	1,394 people
1939	1,433 people
1945	1,320 people
1948	1,233 people
1960	1,367 people
2005	1,485 people
