= Nieznaszyn =

Nieznaszyn Niesnaschin
- Village
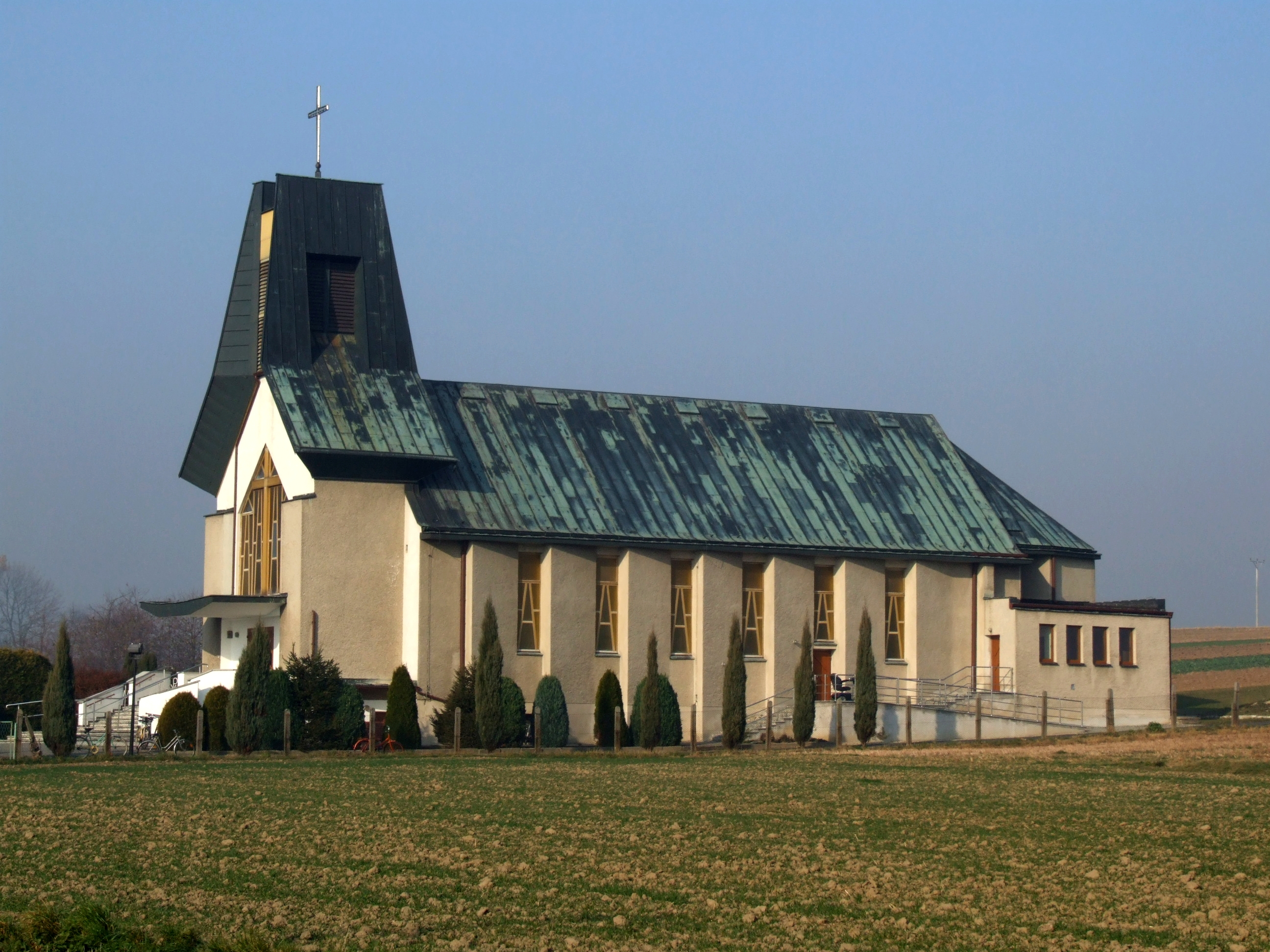
- Church in Nieznaszyn

- Location within Poland
- Coordinates: 50°14′11″N 18°11′15″E
- Country: Poland
- Voivodeship: Opole
- County: Kędzierzyn-Koźle
- Gmina: Cisek
- Population: 225
- Postal code: 47-263

Nieznaszyn ([ɲɛzˈnaʂɨn], additional name in German: Niesnaschin) is a village in the administrative district of Gmina Cisek, within Kędzierzyn-Koźle County, Opole Voivodeship, in southern Poland.
