= Podlesie, Kędzierzyn-Koźle County =

Podlesie Podlesch
- Village
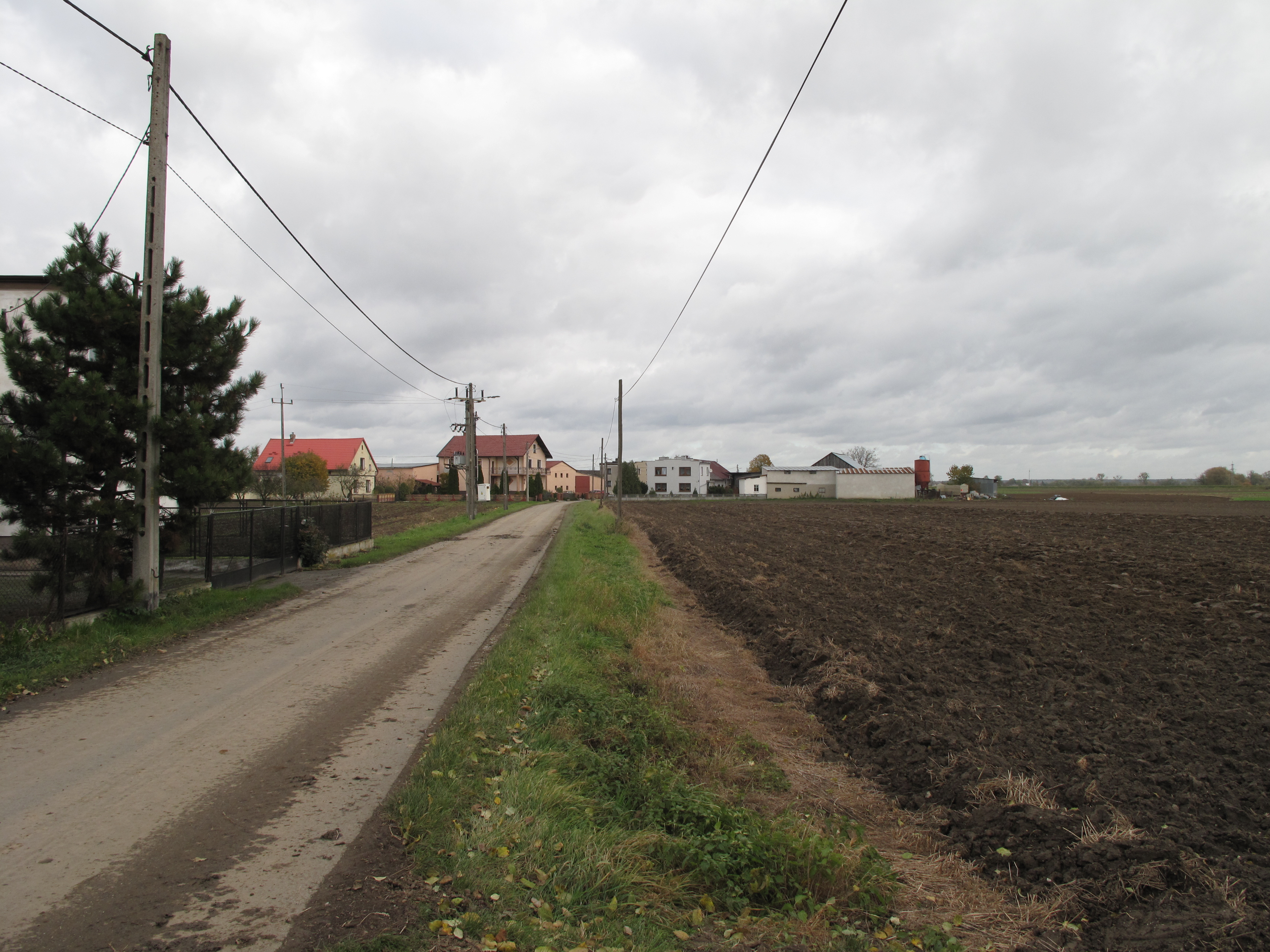
- Road

- Location within Poland
- Coordinates: 50°12′38″N 18°13′37″E
- Country: Poland
- Voivodeship: Opole
- County: Kędzierzyn-Koźle
- Gmina: Cisek

Population
  - Total: 246
- Postal code: 47-253

Podlesie ([pɔdˈlɛɕɛ], additional name in German: Podlesch) is a village in the administrative district of Gmina Cisek, within Kędzierzyn-Koźle County, Opole Voivodeship, in southern Poland.

== Gallery ==
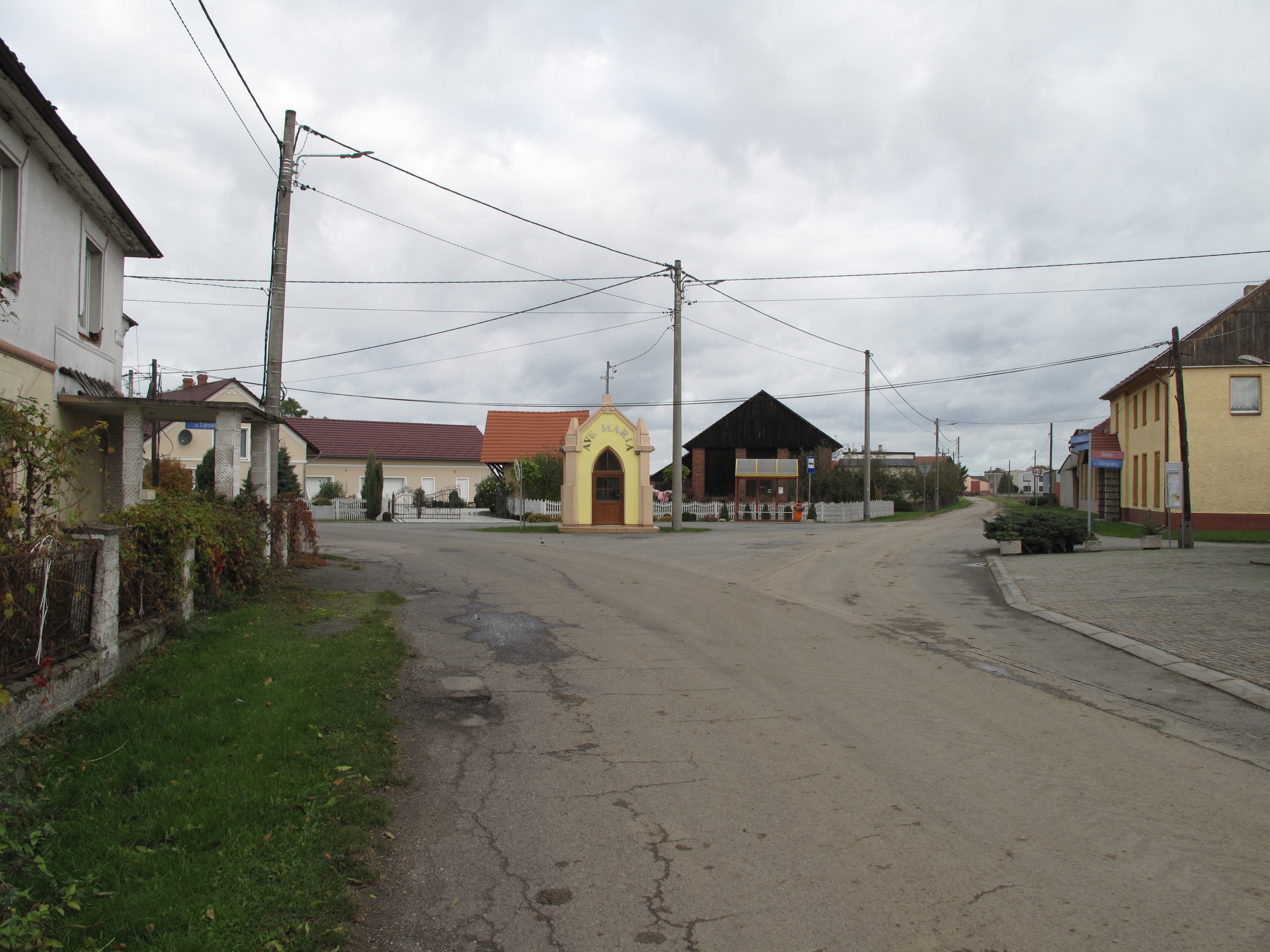
Crossroads

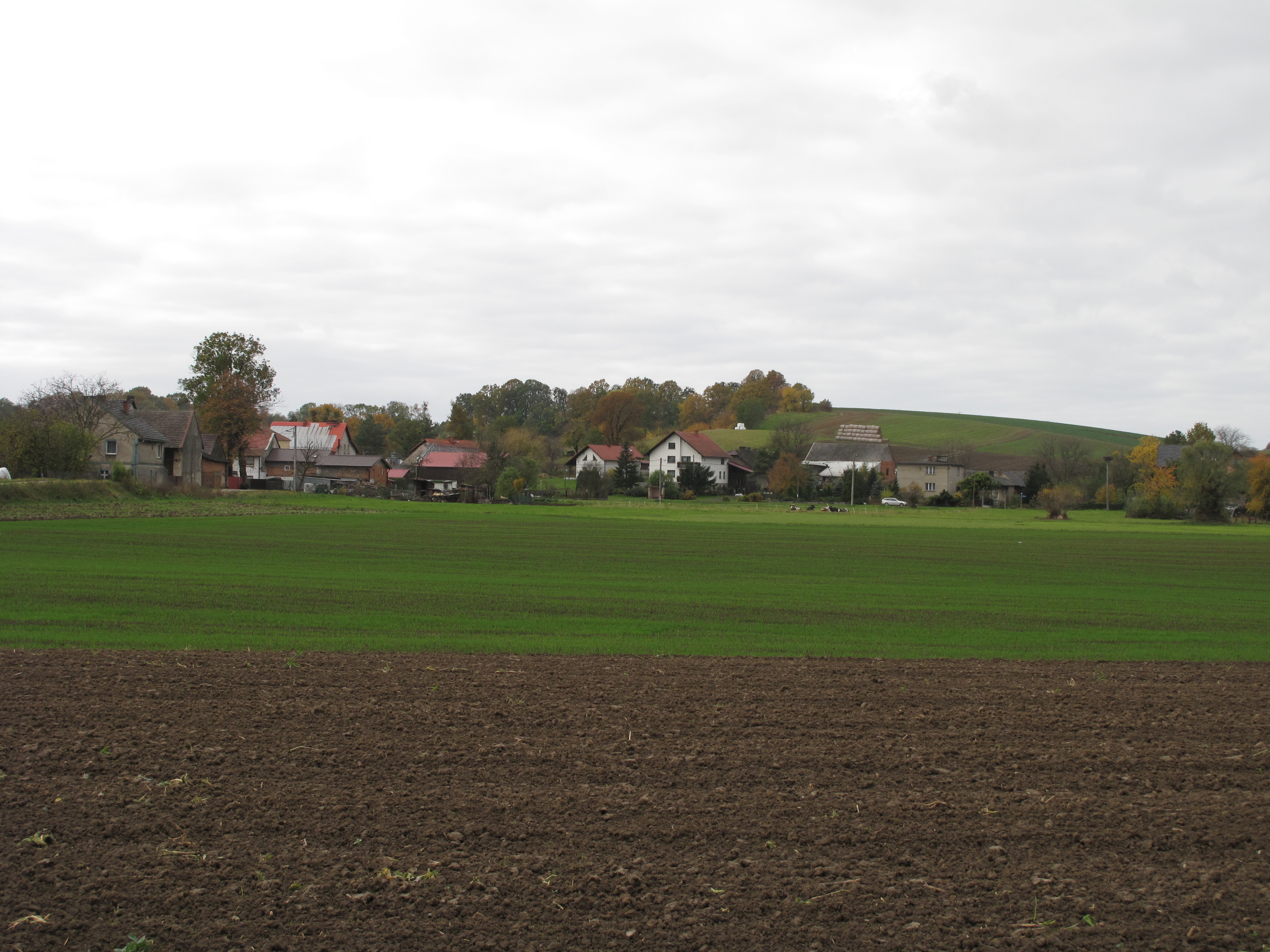
Houses

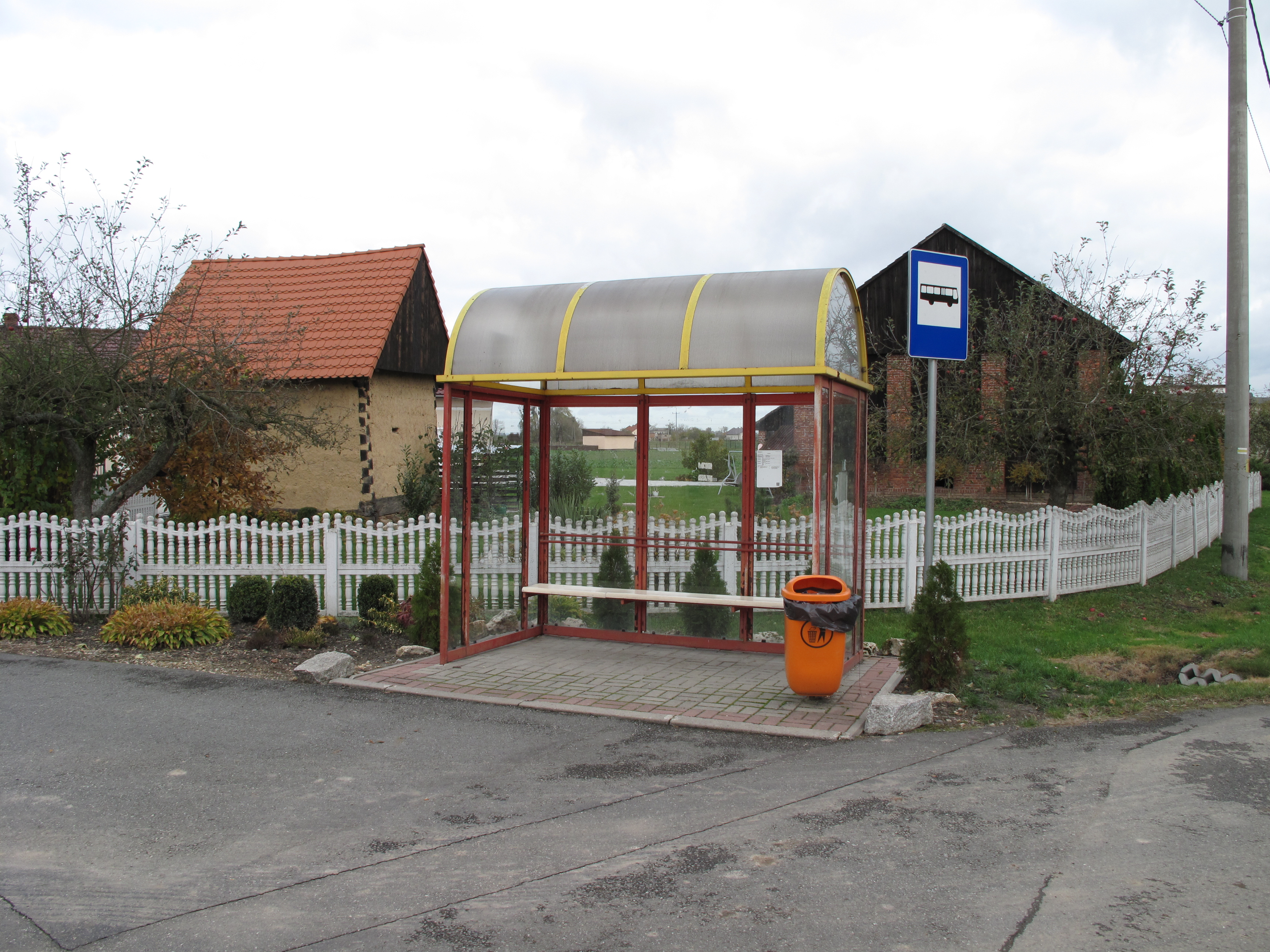
Bus stop
