= Kobylice, Opole Voivodeship =

Kobylice Kobelwitz
- Village
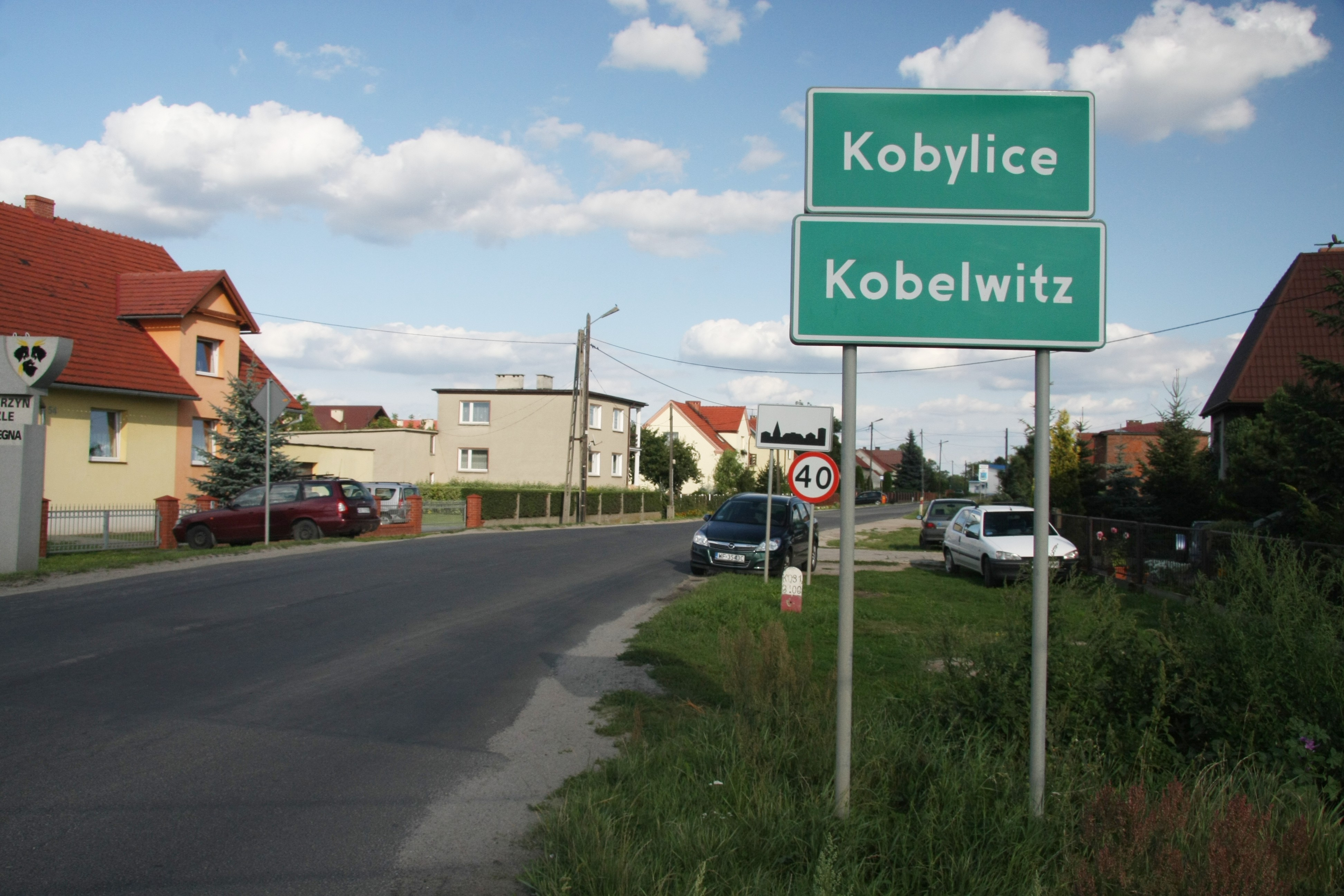

- Location within Poland
- Coordinates: 50°19′1″N 18°10′4″E
- Country: Poland
- Voivodeship: Opole
- County: Kędzierzyn-Koźle
- Gmina: Cisek

Population
  - Total: 527
- Time zone: UTC+1 (CET)
  - Summer (DST): UTC+2 (CEST)
- Postal code: 47-253
- Vehicle registration: OK

Kobylice ([kɔbɨˈlit͡sɛ], additional name in German: Kobelwitz) is a village in the administrative district of Gmina Cisek, within Kędzierzyn-Koźle County, Opole Voivodeship, in southern Poland.

== History ==
The name of the village is of Polish origin and comes from the word kobyła, which means "mare". In the late 19th century, it had an almost entirely Catholic population of 456.
