= Roszowicki Las =

Roszowicki Las Roschowitzwald
- Village
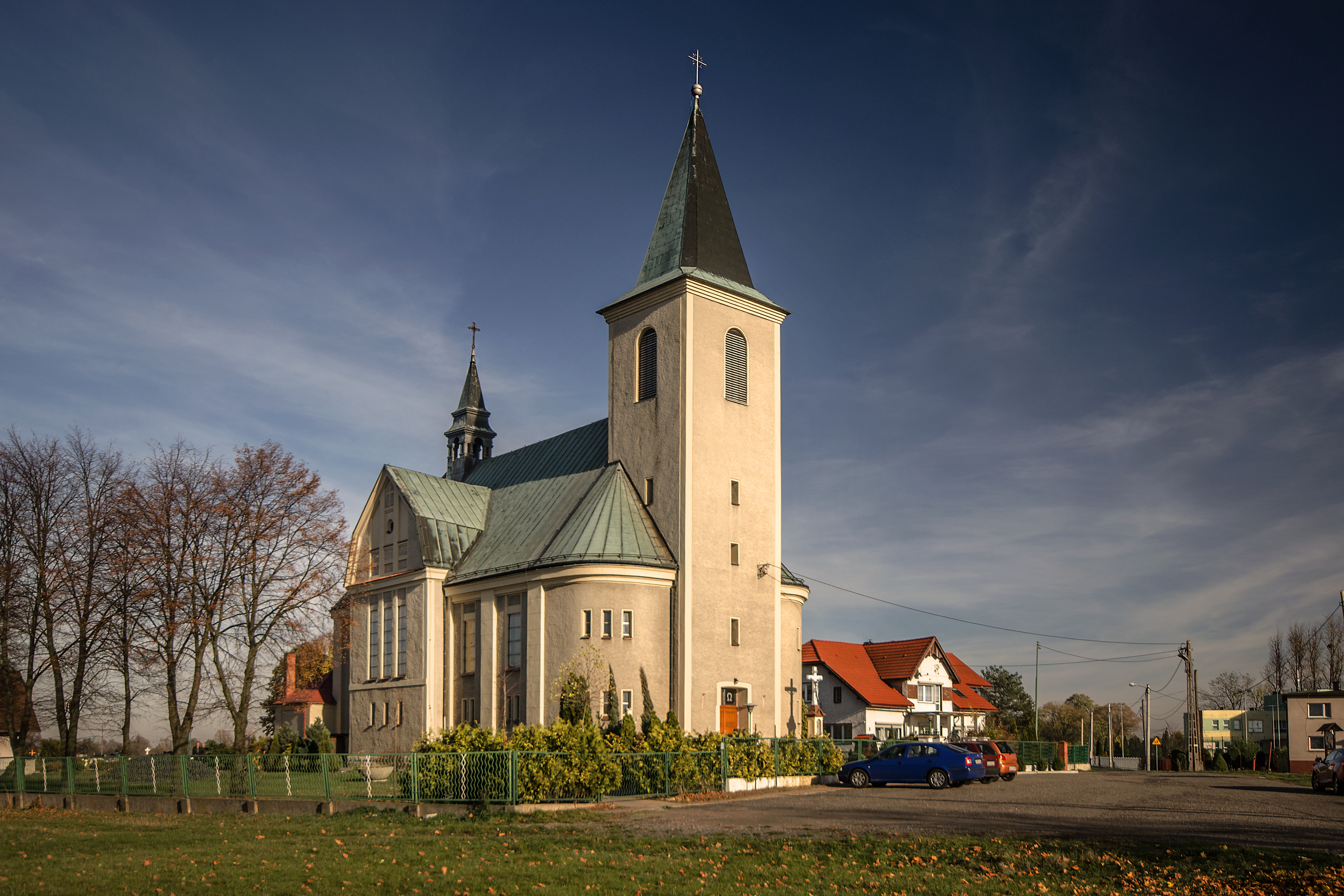
- Saint Anthony church in Roszowicki Las

- Location within Poland
- Coordinates: 50°15′N 18°12′E
- Country: Poland
- Voivodeship: Opole
- County: Kędzierzyn-Koźle
- Gmina: Cisek

Population
  - Total: 590
- Postal code: 47-253

Roszowicki Las ([rɔʂɔˈvit͡ski ˈlas], additional name in German: Roschowitzwald) is a village in the administrative district of Gmina Cisek, within Kędzierzyn-Koźle County, Opole Voivodeship, in southern Poland.
