= Przewóz, Opole Voivodeship =

Przewóz Przewos
- Village
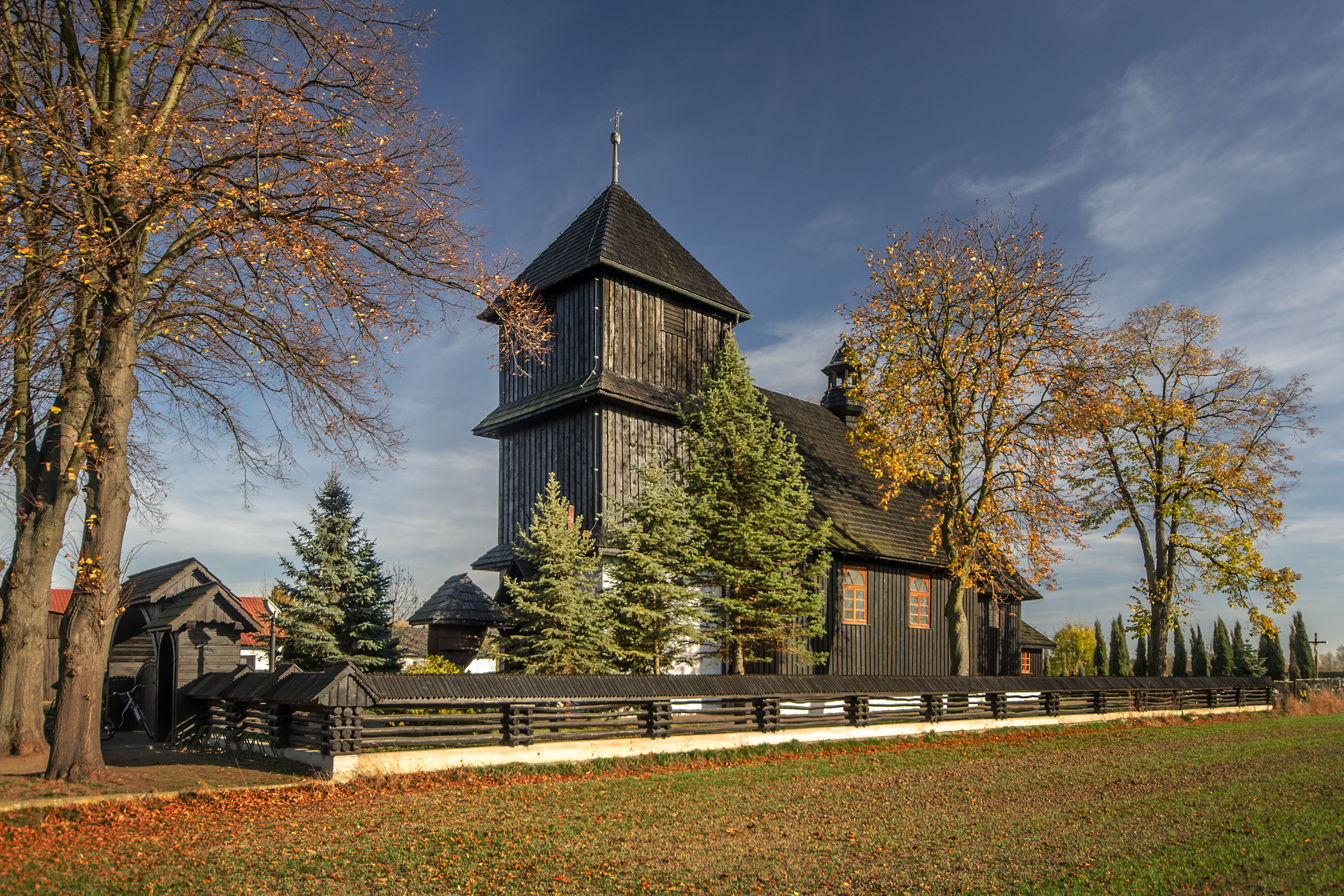
- Jude the Apostle Church in Przewóz

- Location within Poland
- Coordinates: 50°13′34″N 18°15′16″E
- Country: Poland
- Voivodeship: Opole
- County: Kędzierzyn-Koźle
- Gmina: Cisek

Population
  - Total: 345
- Time zone: UTC+1 (CET)
  - Summer (DST): UTC+2 (CEST)
- Postal code: 47-253
- Vehicle registration: OK
- Website: http://www.przewoz.org

Przewóz ([ˈpʂɛvus], additional name in German: Przewos) is a village in the administrative district of Gmina Cisek, within Kędzierzyn-Koźle County, Opole Voivodeship, in southern Poland.

In 1861, the village had a population of 496, entirely Catholic by confession.
