= Landzmierz =

Landzmierz Landsmierz
- Village
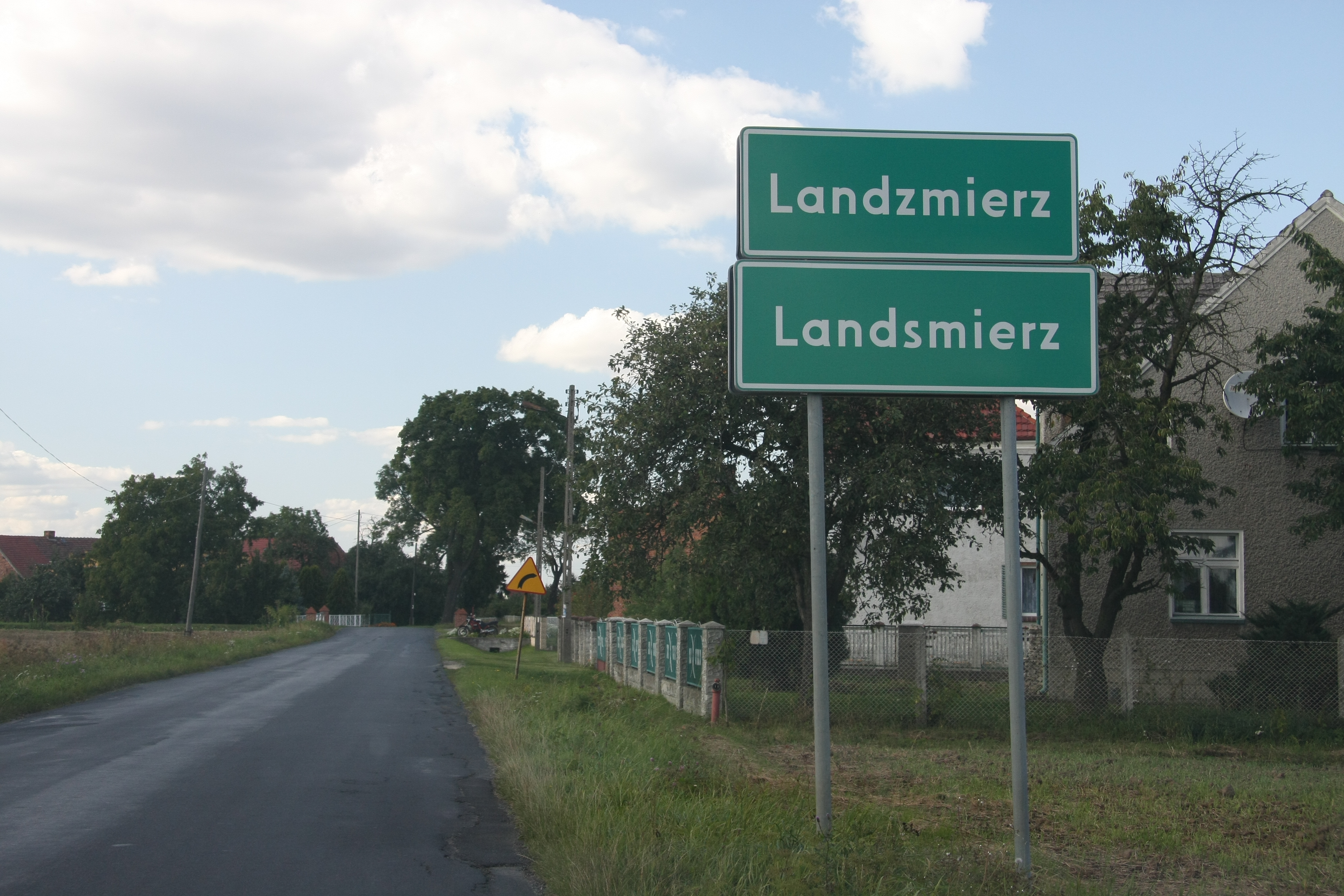

- Location within Poland
- Coordinates: 50°17′50″N 18°11′44″E
- Country: Poland
- Voivodeship: Opole
- County: Kędzierzyn-Koźle
- Gmina: Cisek

Population
  - Total: 650
- Postal code: 47-253

Landzmierz ([ˈland͡zmjɛʂ], additional name in German: Landsmierz) is a village in the administrative district of Gmina Cisek, within Kędzierzyn-Koźle County, Opole Voivodeship, in southern Poland.
