= Sukowice =

Sukowice Suckowitz
- Village
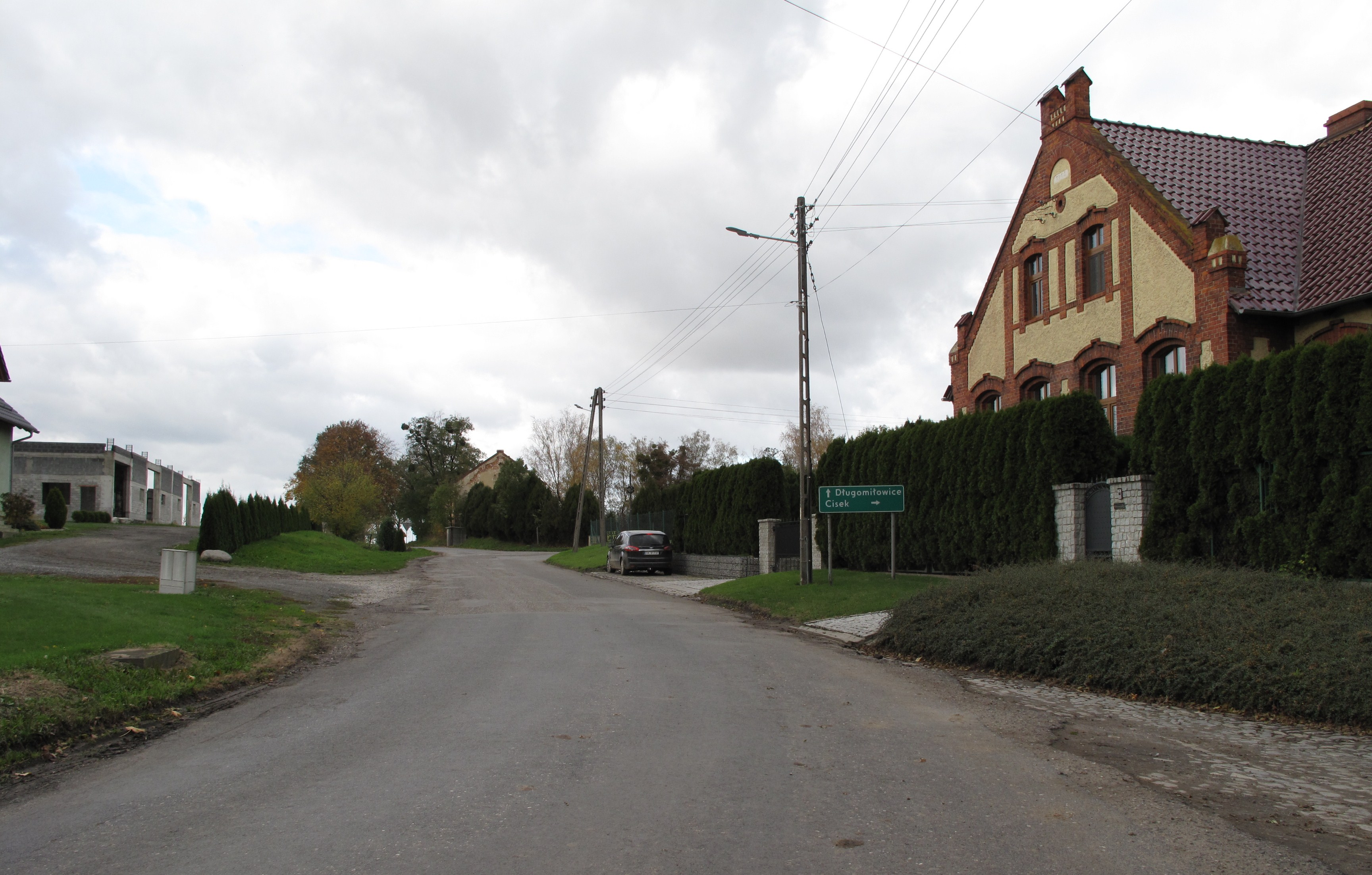
- Road

- Location within Poland
- Coordinates: 50°16′4″N 18°10′28″E
- Country: Poland
- Voivodeship: Opole
- County: Kędzierzyn-Koźle
- Gmina: Cisek

Population
  - Total: 374
- Time zone: UTC+1 (CET)
  - Summer (DST): UTC+2 (CEST)
- Postal code: 47-263
- Vehicle registration: OK

Sukowice ([sukɔˈvit͡sɛ], additional name in German: Suckowitz) is a village in the administrative district of Gmina Cisek, within Kędzierzyn-Koźle County, Opole Voivodeship, in southern Poland.

== Gallery ==
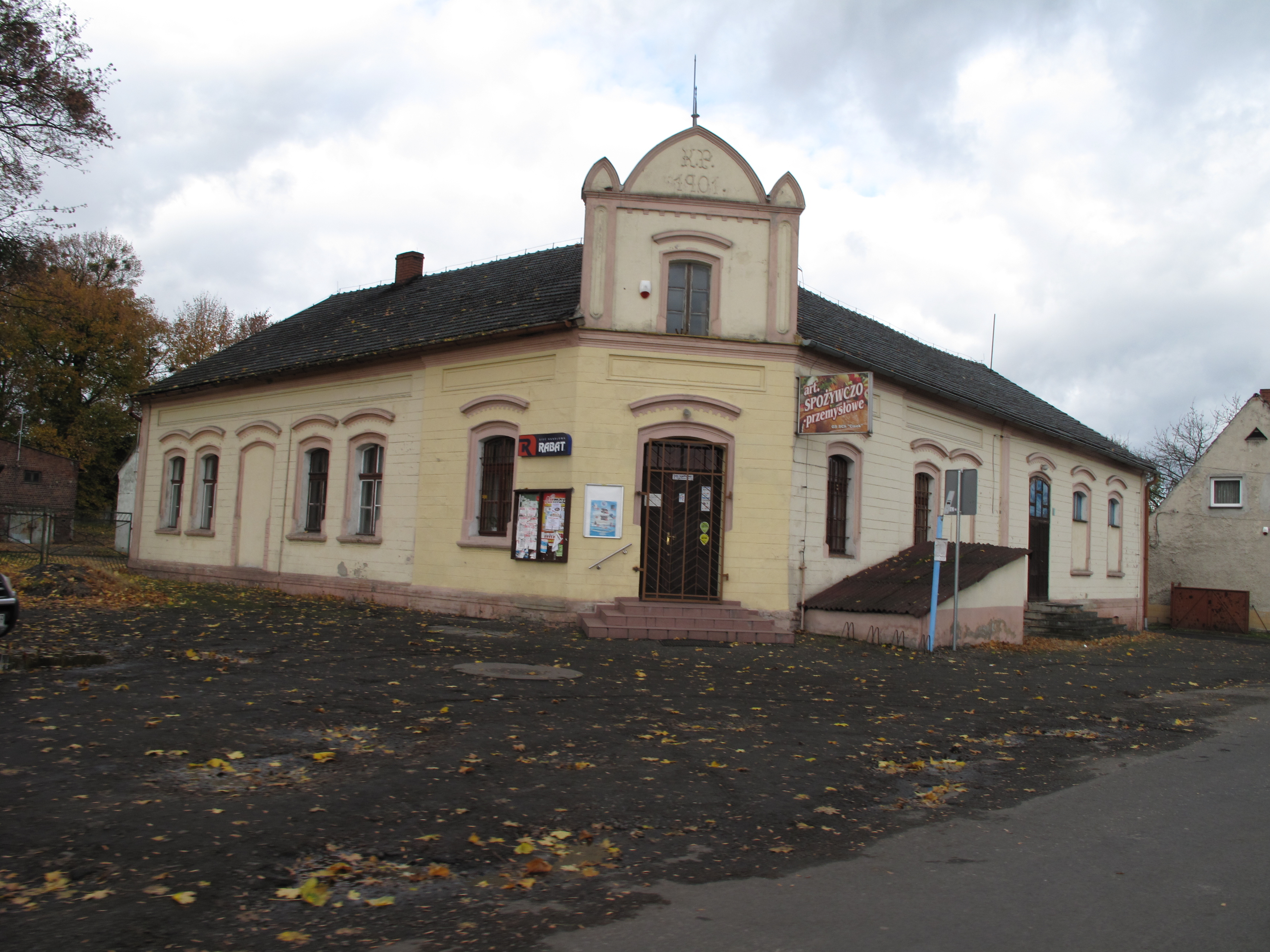
Shop

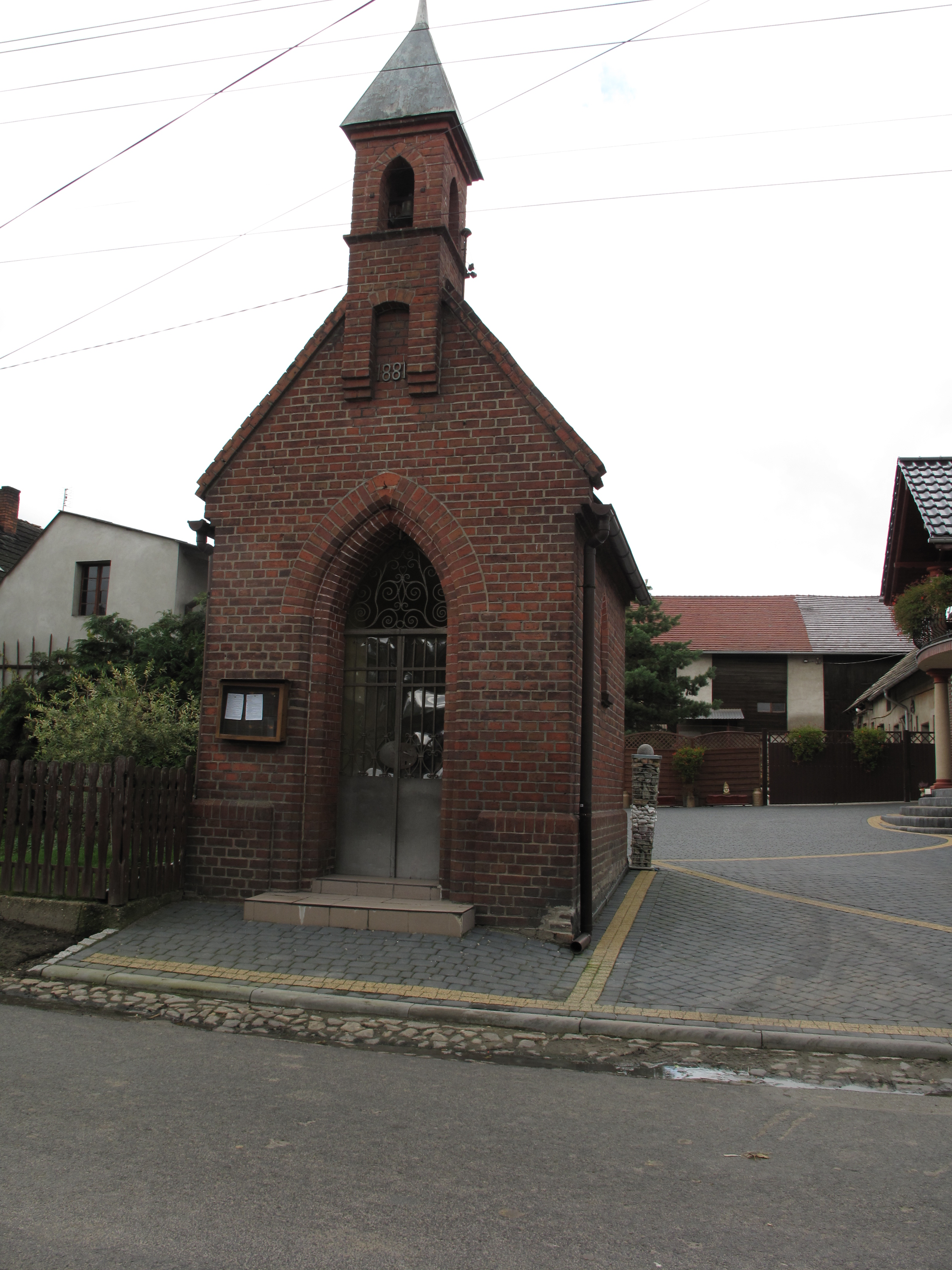
Chapel

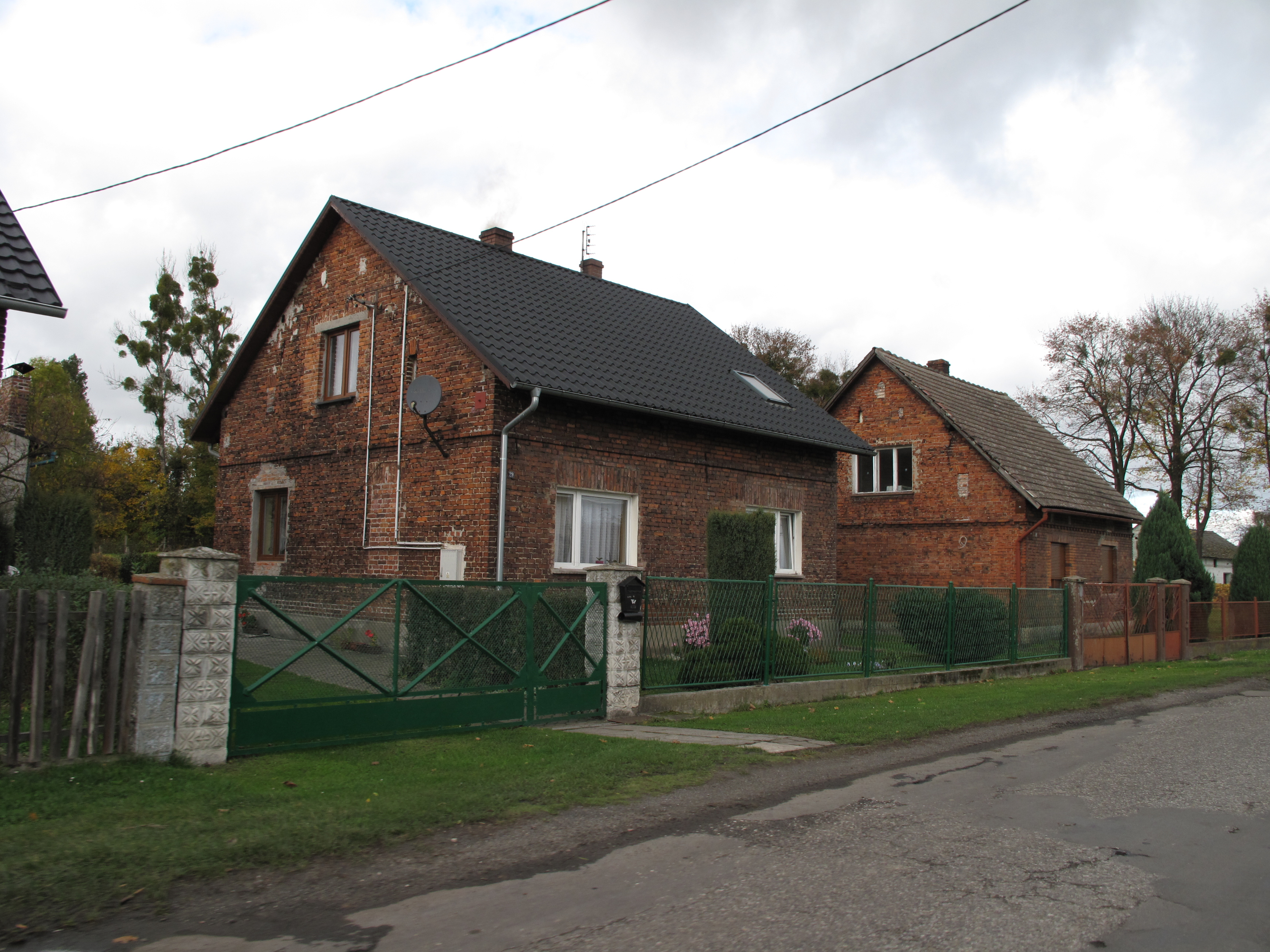
Houses
