= Gmina Cisek =

Gmina Cisek Gemeinde Czissek Cisek Commune
- Gmina
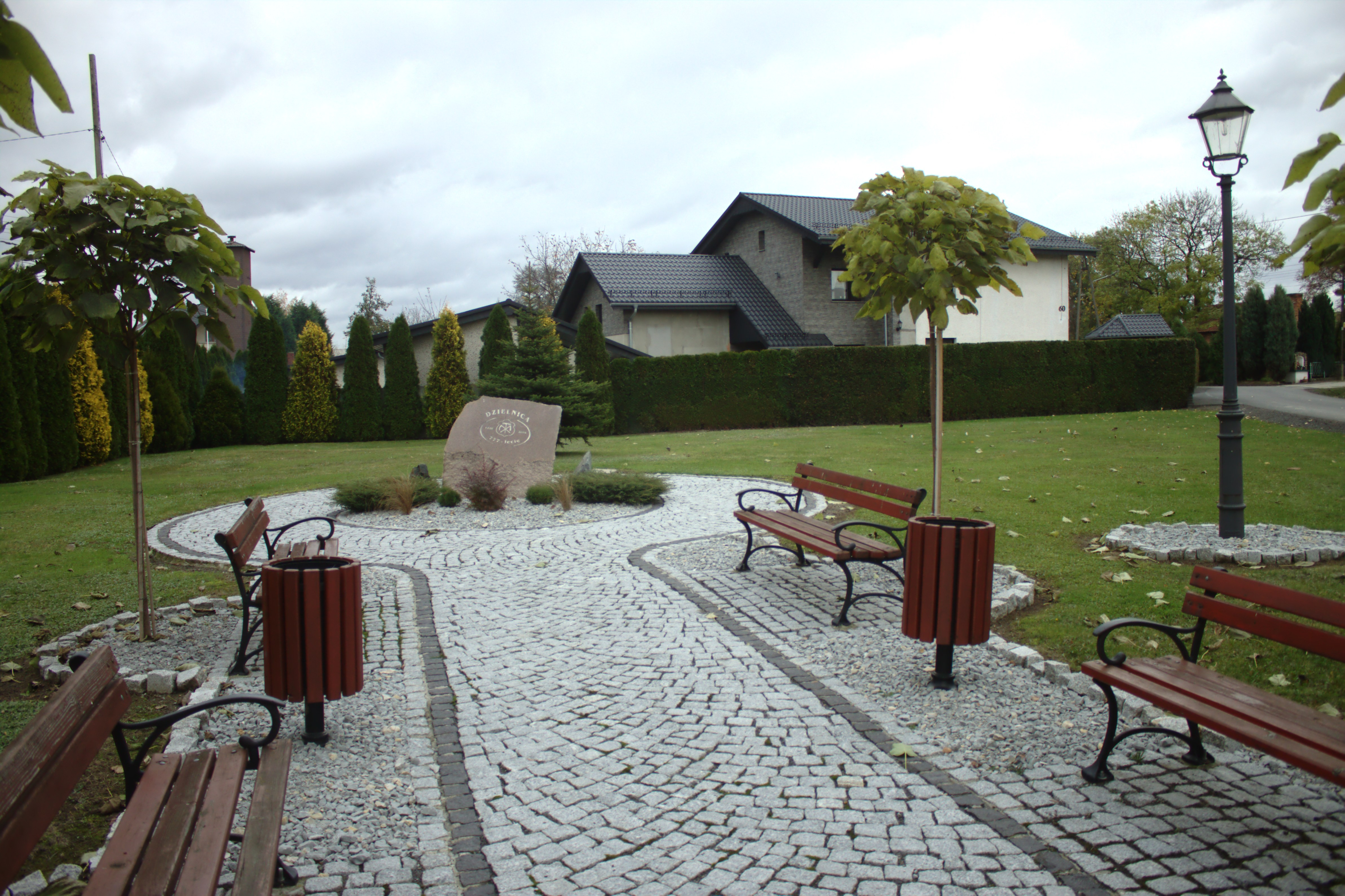
- Park in Dzielnica

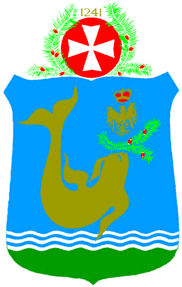
- Coat of arms
- Interactive map of Gmina Cisek; Gemeinde Czissek
- Coordinates (Cisek): 50°17′N 18°12′E
- Country: Poland
- Voivodeship: Opole
- County: Kędzierzyn-Koźle
- Seat: Cisek

Area
  - Total: 70.89 km^{2} (27.37 sq mi)

Population (2019-06-30)
  - Total: 5,624
  - Density: 79.33/km^{2} (205.5/sq mi)
- Time zone: UTC+1 (CET)
  - Summer (DST): UTC+2 (CEST)
- Vehicle registration: OK
- Website: https://cisek.pl

Gmina Cisek (German: Gemeinde Czissek) is a rural gmina (administrative district) in Kędzierzyn-Koźle County, Opole Voivodeship, in southern Poland. Its seat is the village of Cisek, which lies approximately 8 kilometres (5 mi) south of Kędzierzyn-Koźle and 47 km (29 mi) south-east of the regional capital Opole.

The gmina covers an area of 70.89 square kilometres (27.4 sq mi), and as of 2019, its total population was 5,624. Since 2007, the commune has been bilingual in Polish and German, and its signs are displayed in both languages.

== Administrative divisions ==
The commune contains the villages and settlements of:

- Cisek
- Błażejowice
- Dzielnica
- Kobylice
- Landzmierz
- Łany
- Miejsce Odrzańskie
- Nieznaszyn
- Podlesie
- Przewóz
- Roszowice
- Roszowicki Las
- Steblów
- Sukowice

== Neighbouring gminas ==
Gmina Cisek is bordered by the gminas of Kuźnia Raciborska and Rudnik.

== Gallery ==
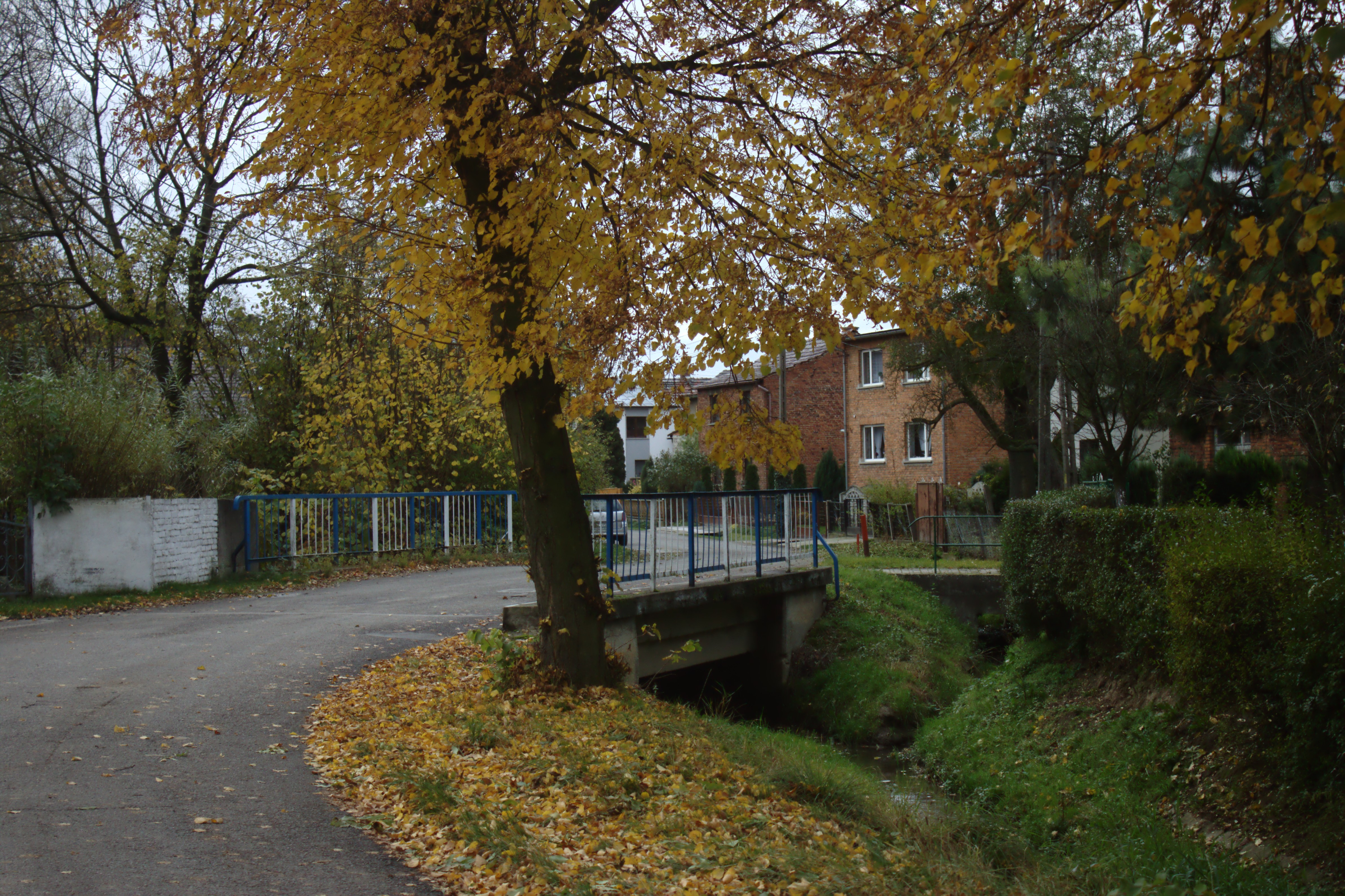
Bridge in Błażejowice

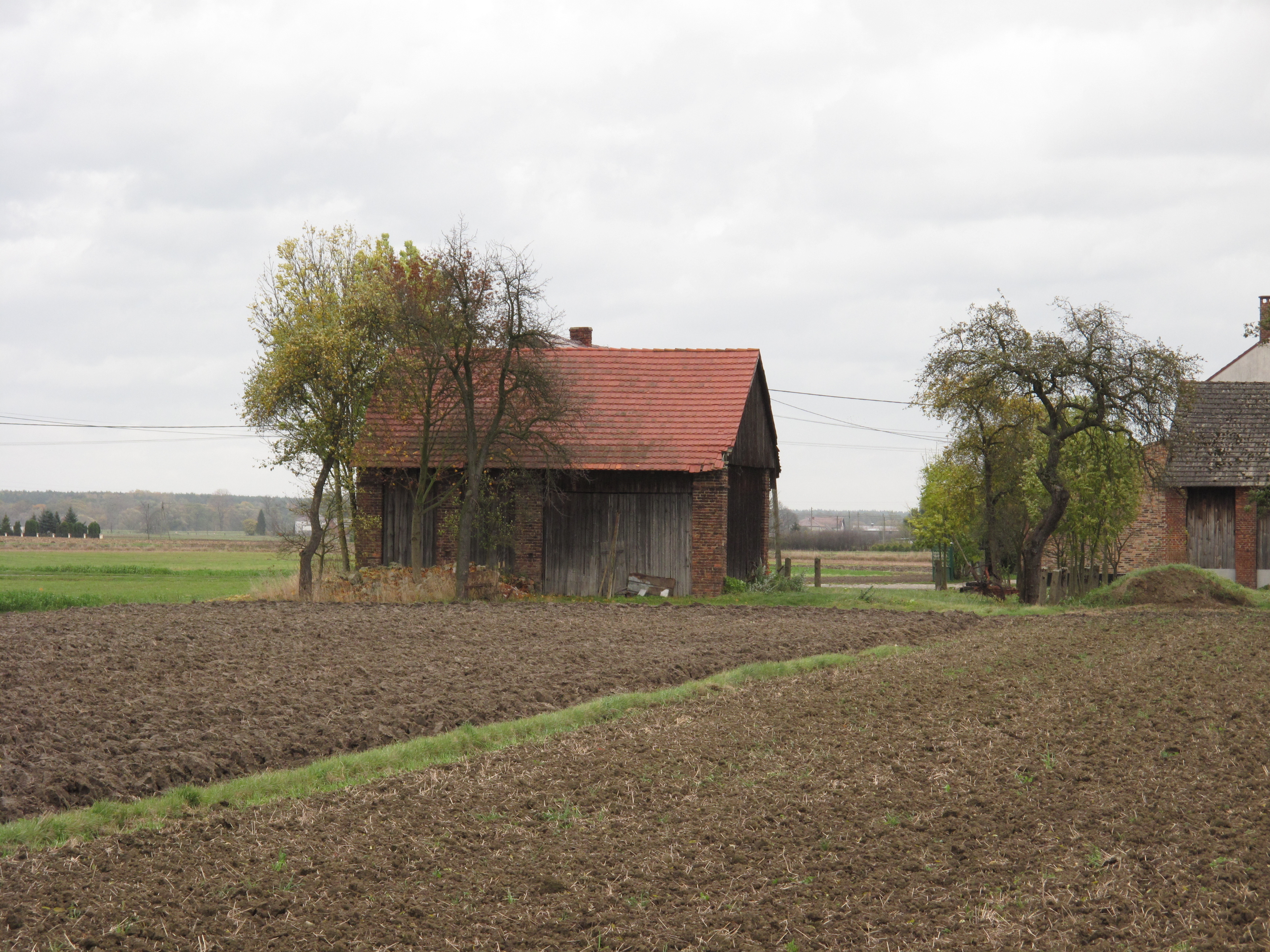
Barn in Roszowicki Las

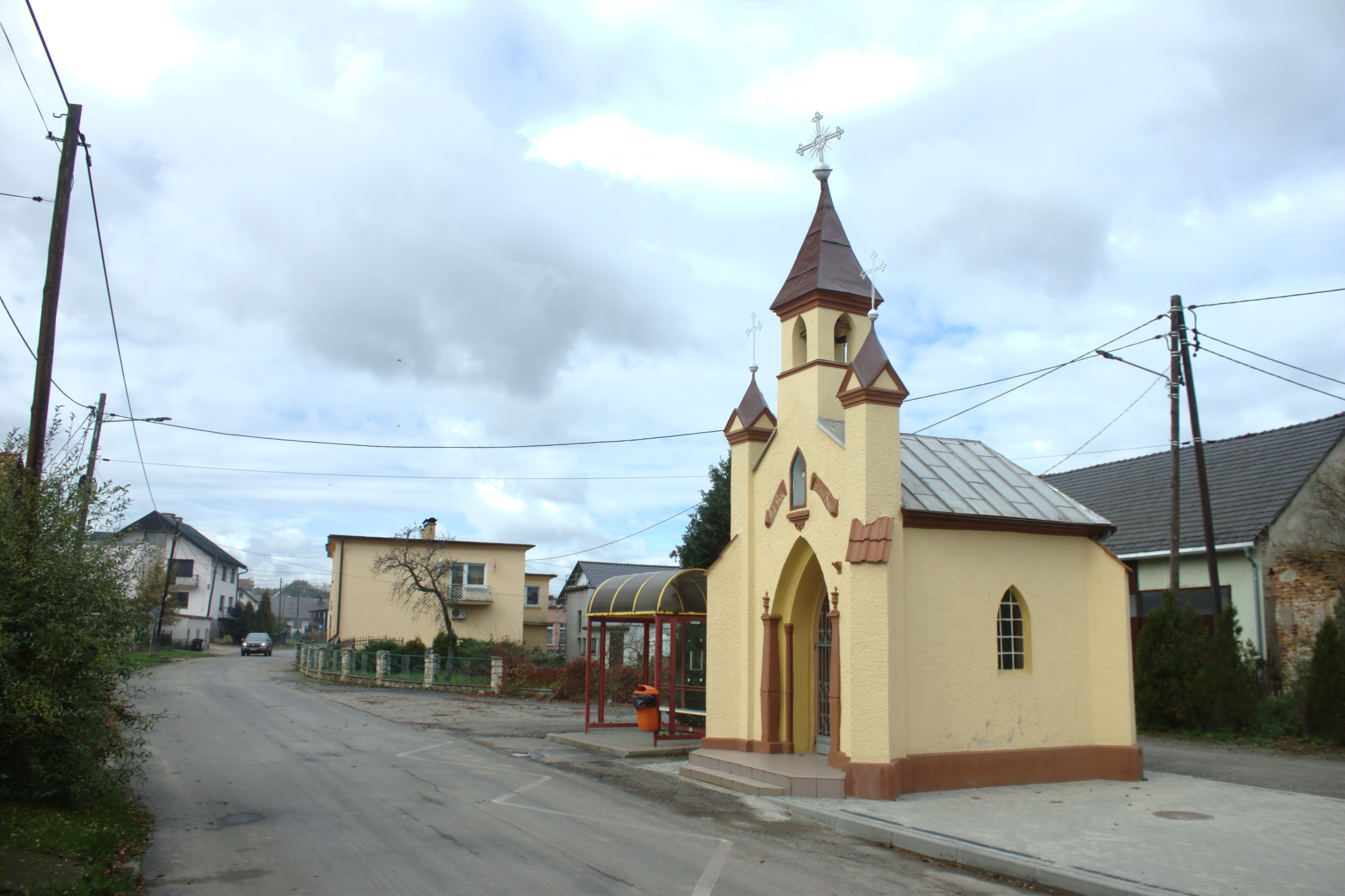
Village chapel in Nieznaszyn
