= Łany, Opole Voivodeship =

Łany Lohnau
- Village
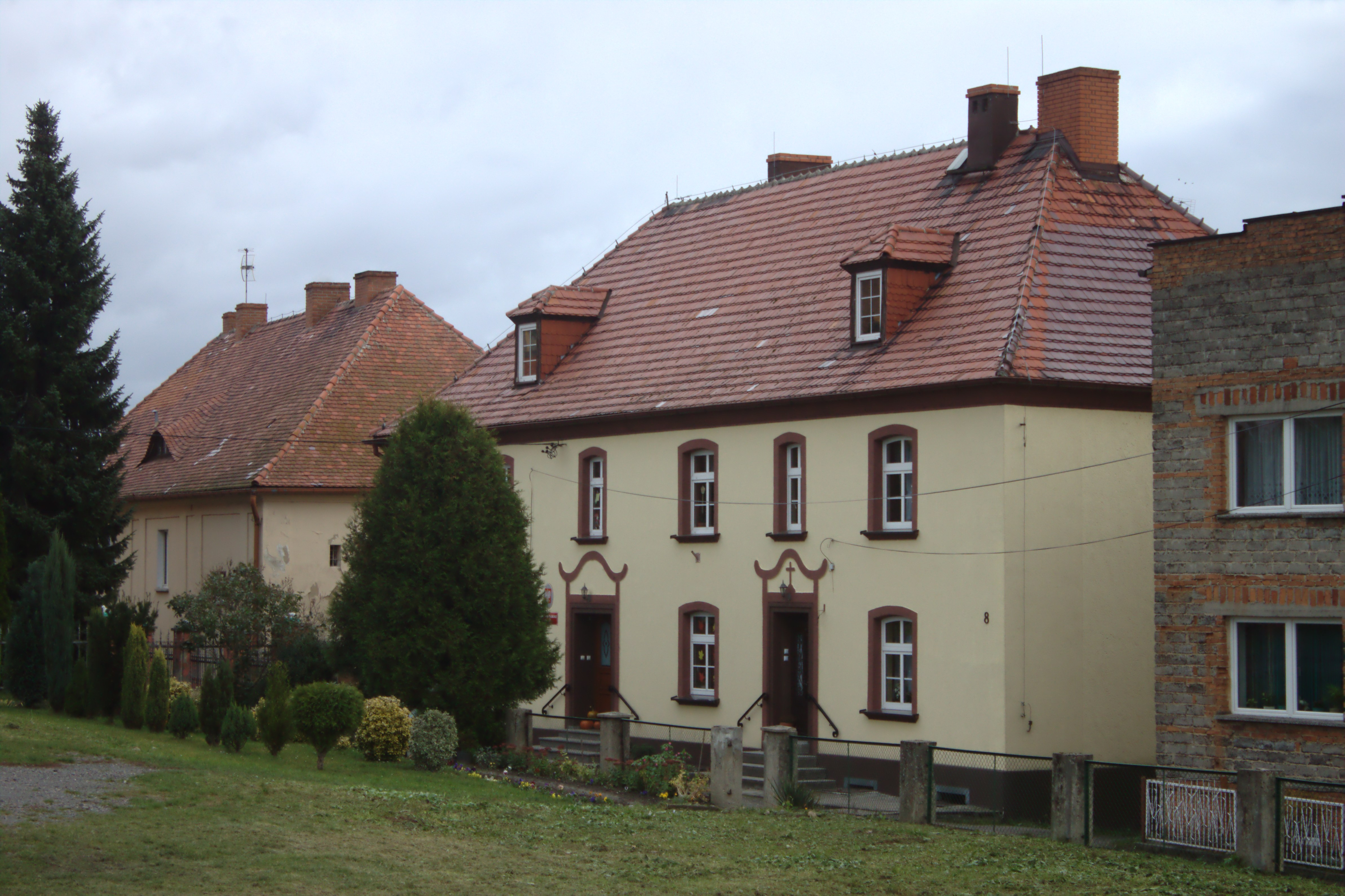

- Location within Poland
- Coordinates: 50°12′44″N 18°11′40″E
- Country: Poland
- Voivodeship: Opole
- County: Kędzierzyn-Koźle
- Gmina: Cisek

Population
  - Total: 719
- Postal code: 47-253

Łany ([ˈwanɨ], additional name in German: Lohnau) is a village in the administrative district of Gmina Cisek, within Kędzierzyn-Koźle County, Opole Voivodeship, in southern Poland.

== Gallery ==
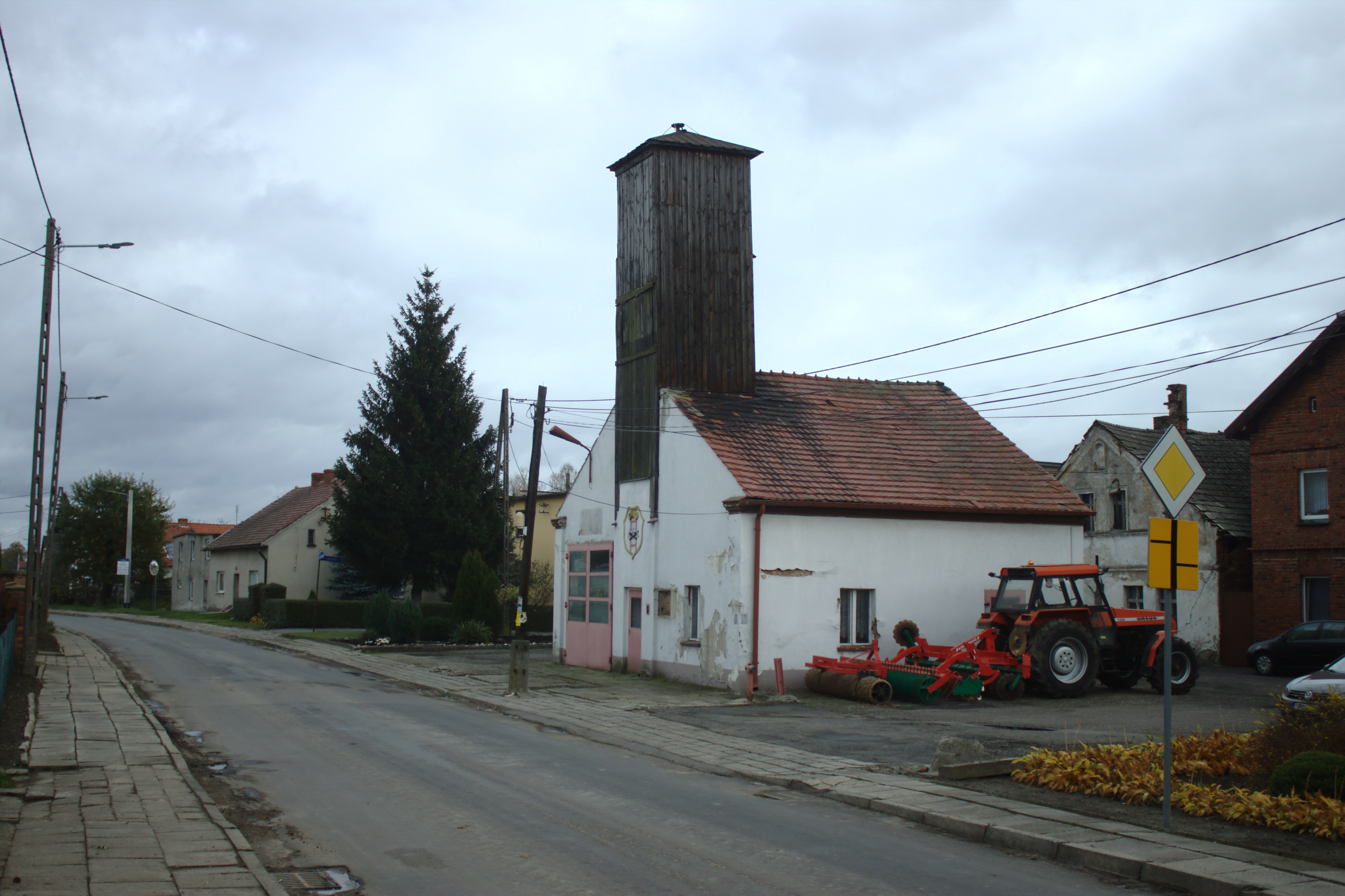
Road with fire department house

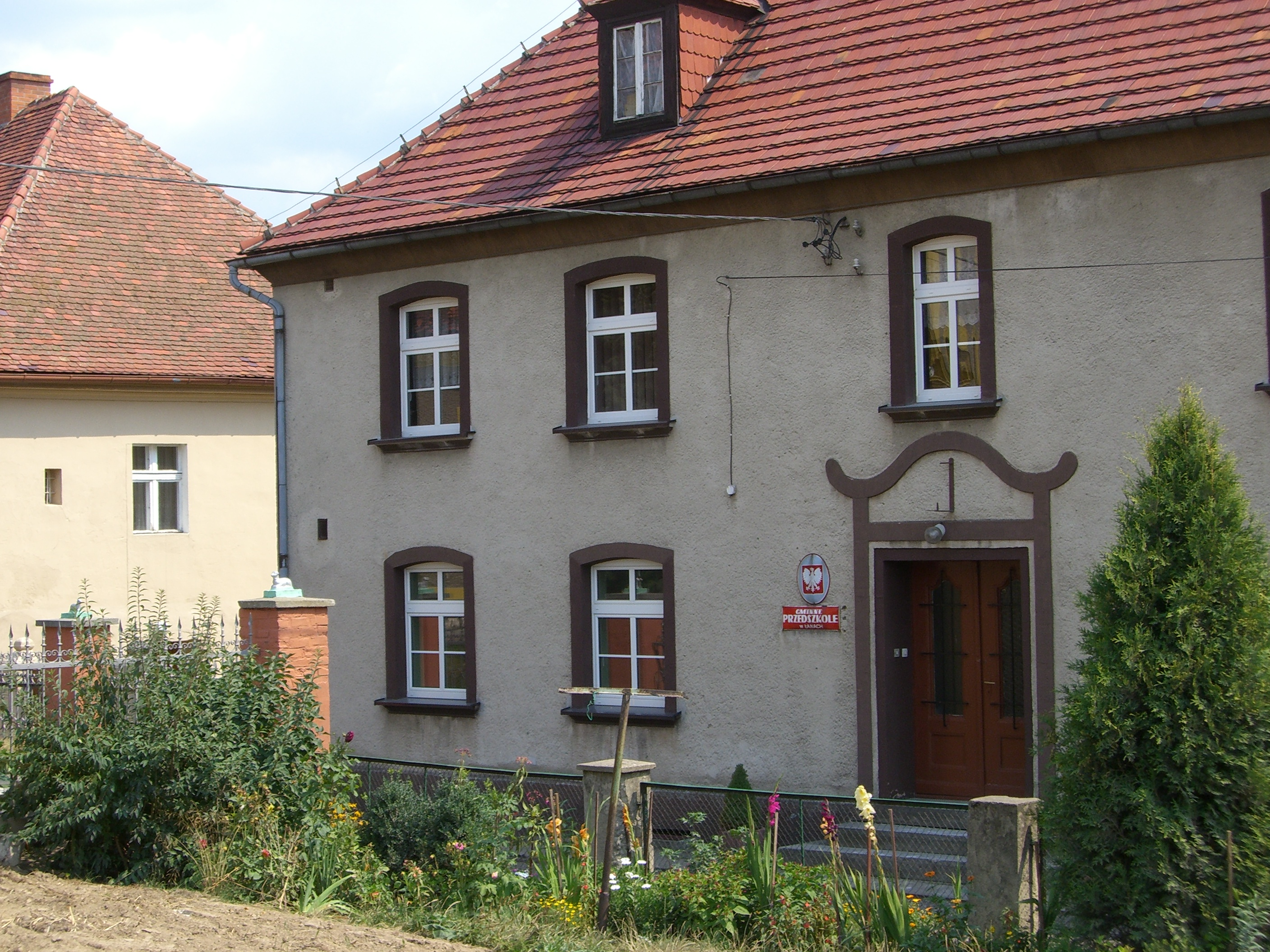
Kindergarten

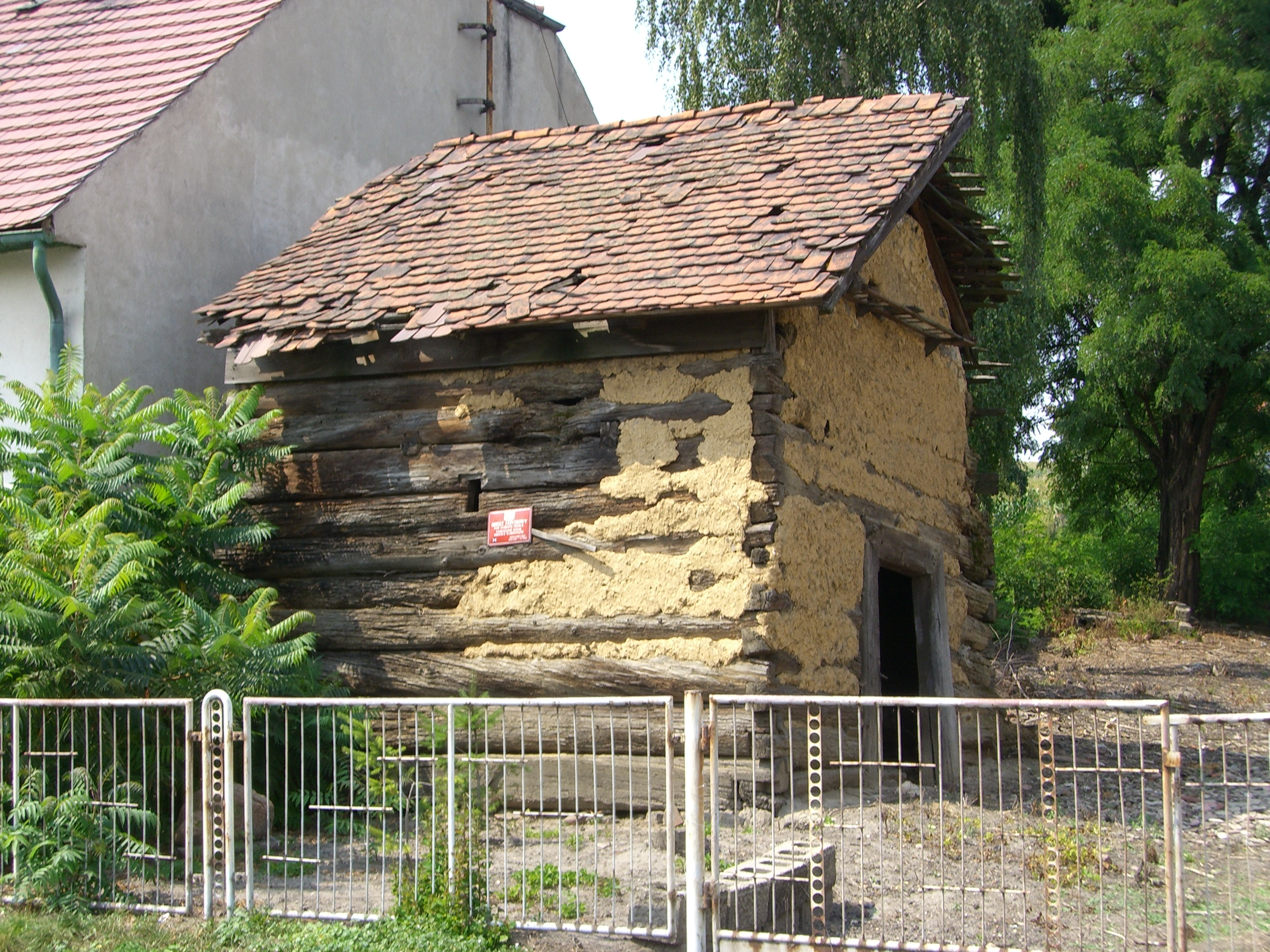
Log cabin
