= Steblów, Kędzierzyn-Koźle County =

Steblów Stöblau
- Village
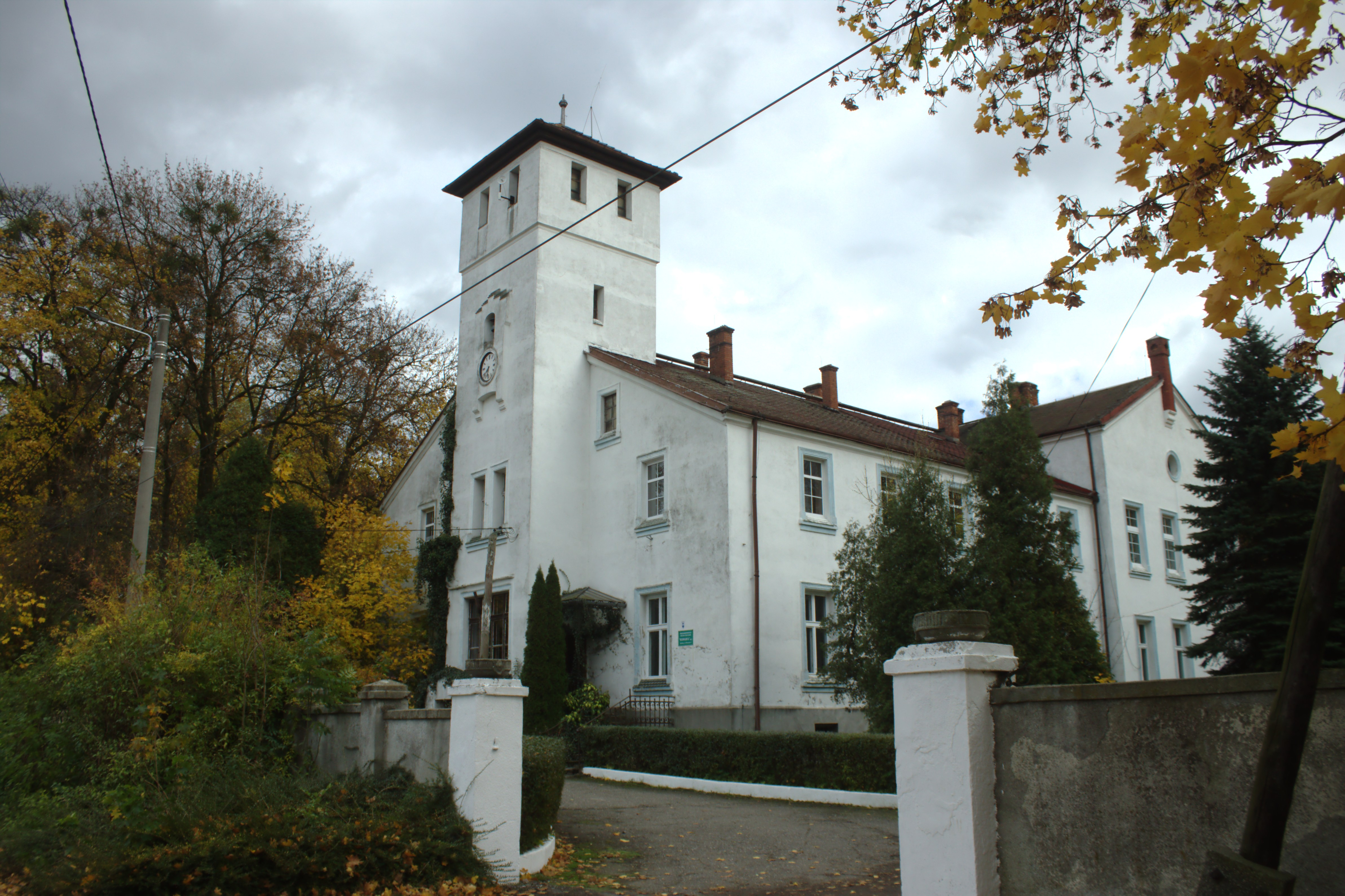
- Palace

- Location within Poland
- Coordinates: 50°15′N 18°10′E
- Country: Poland
- Voivodeship: Opole
- County: Kędzierzyn-Koźle
- Gmina: Cisek

Population
  - Total: 333
- Postal code: 47-263

Steblów ([ˈstɛbluf], additional name in German: Stöblau) is a village in the administrative district of Gmina Cisek, within Kędzierzyn-Koźle County, Opole Voivodeship, in southern Poland.
