= Dzielnica, Opole Voivodeship =

Dzielnica Dzielnitz
- Village
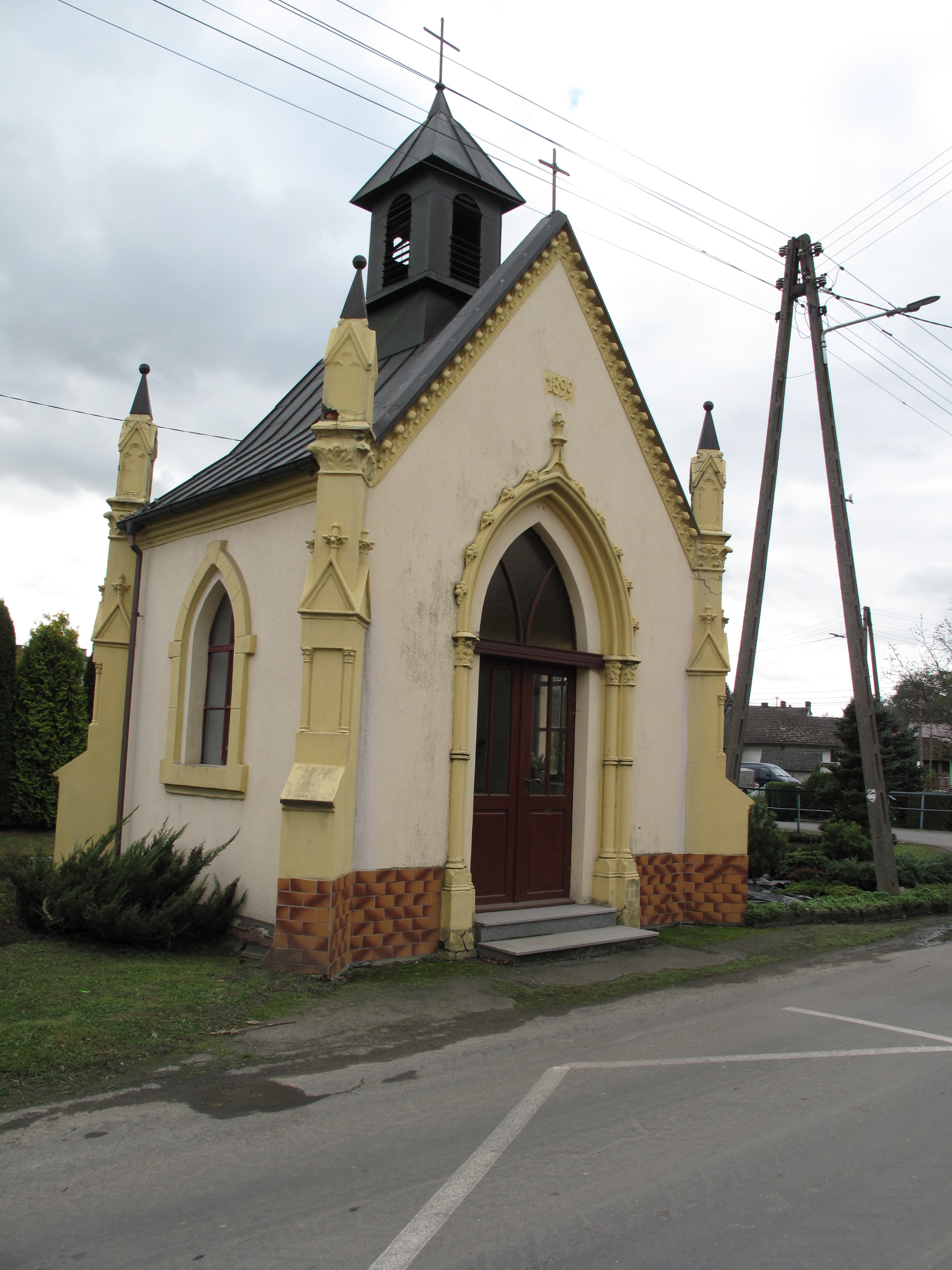
- Village chapell

- Coat of arms

- Location within Poland
- Coordinates: 50°13′37″N 18°12′57″E
- Country: Poland
- Voivodeship: Opole
- County: Kędzierzyn-Koźle
- Gmina: Cisek
- Population: 232
- Postal code: 47-253

Dzielnica ([d͡ʑɛlˈnit͡sa], additional name in German: Dzielnitz) is a village in the administrative district of Gmina Cisek, within Kędzierzyn-Koźle County, Opole Voivodeship, in southern Poland.

== Neolithic site ==
Archeology in the village revealed that it was a site of agricultural settlement as far back as at least 7.5 thousand years ago. There is evidence of growing of wheat, barley and flax, as well as rye (the last one being the oldest attested anywhere in Europe). Found was also a fragment of a ceramic female figurine interpreted as a symbol of fertility (see paleolithic Venus). There are also traces of fortification in a form of V-shaped trenches.

== Gallery ==
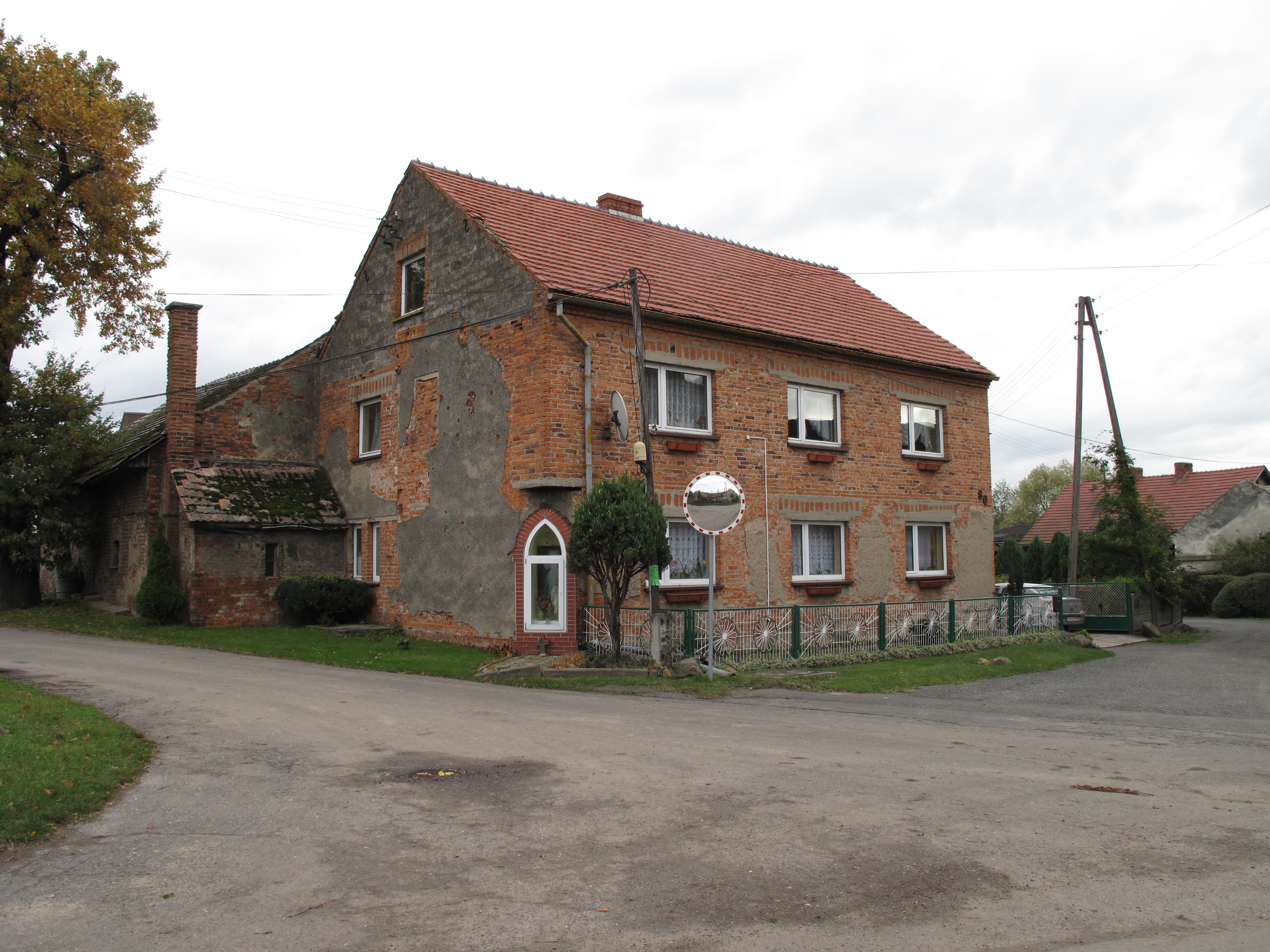
House

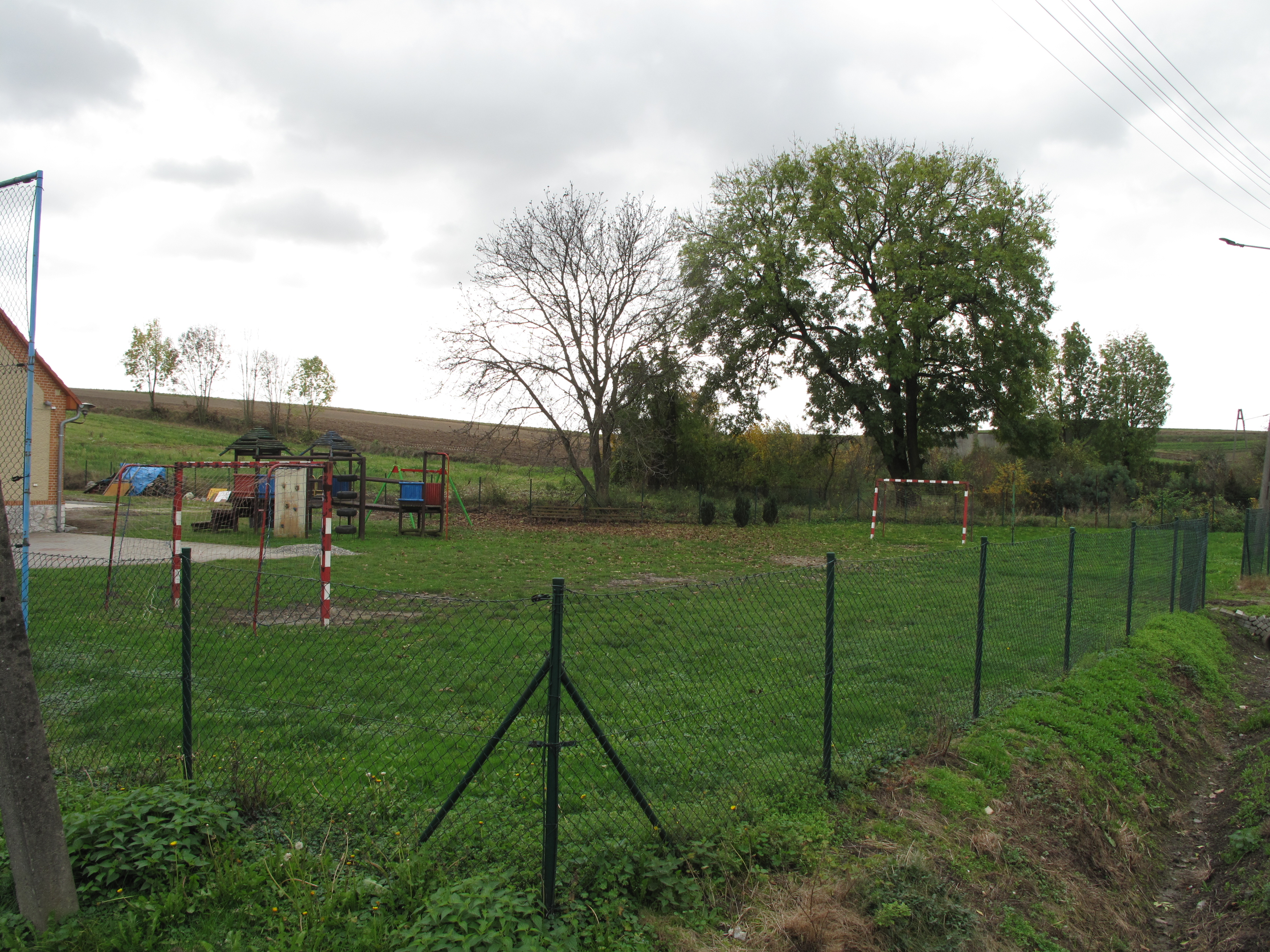
Playground

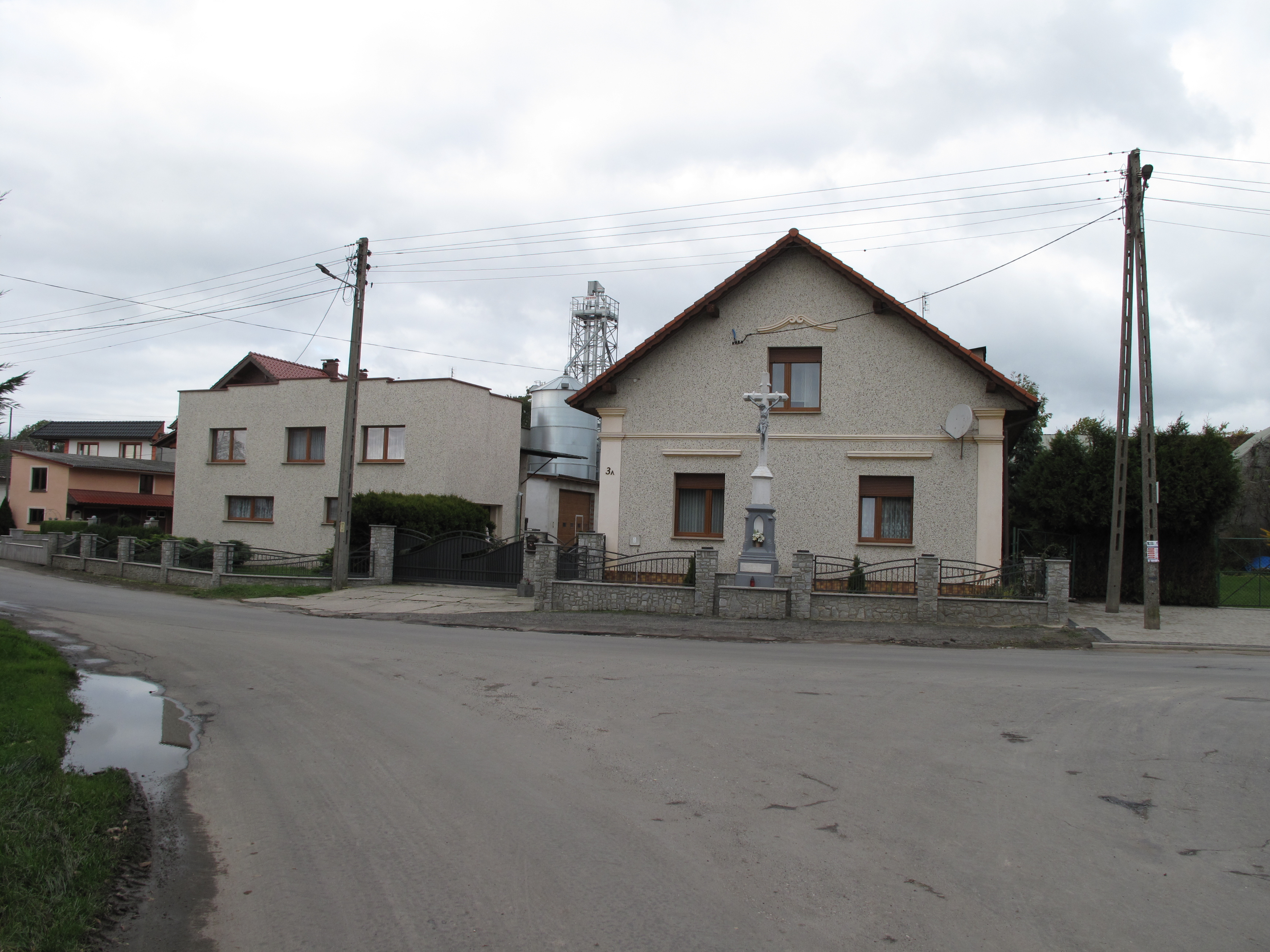
Houses
