= Błażejowice, Kędzierzyn-Koźle County =

Błażejowice Blaseowitz
- Village
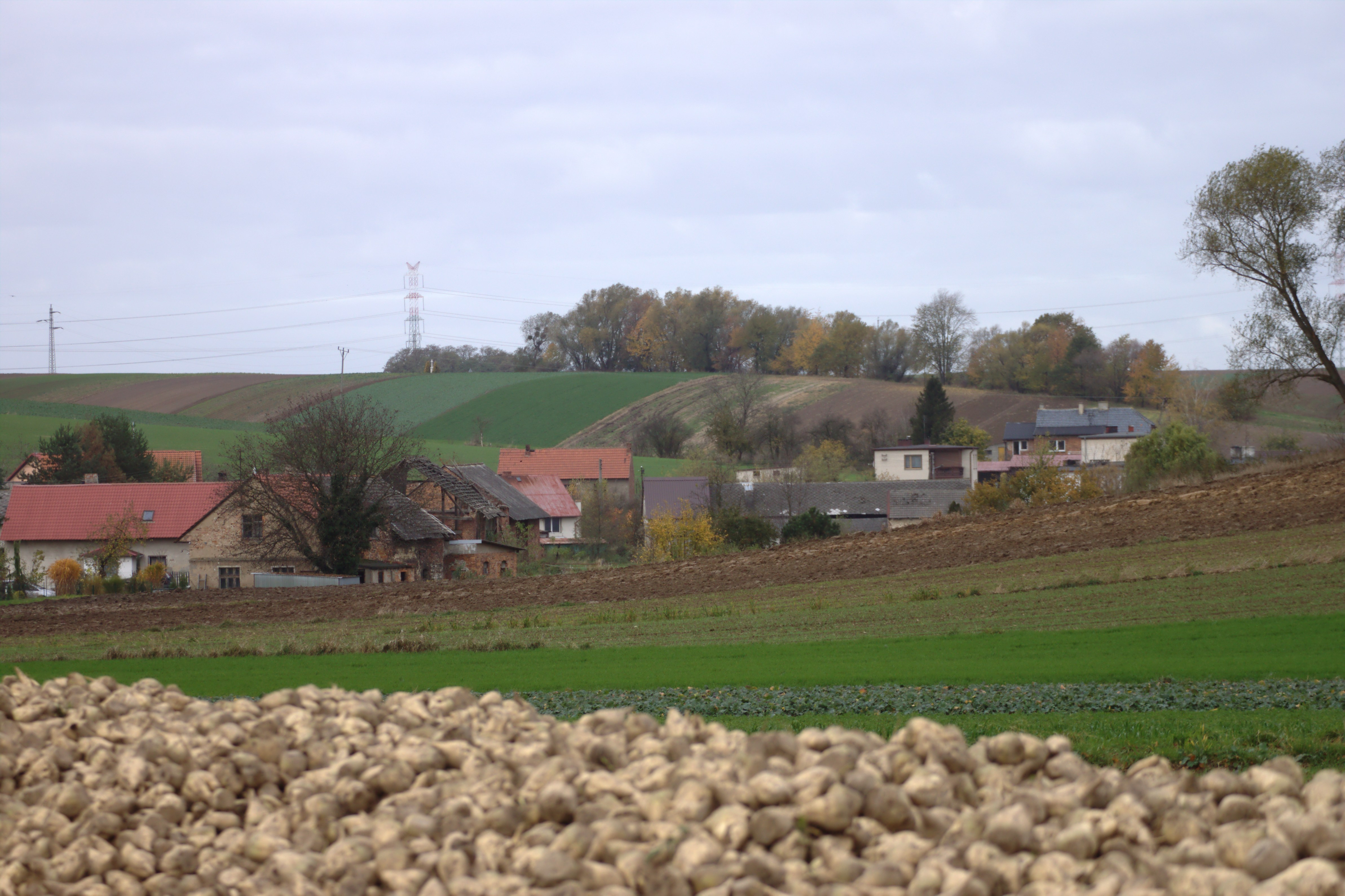

- Location within Poland
- Coordinates: 50°11′51″N 18°11′11″E
- Country: Poland
- Voivodeship: Opole
- County: Kędzierzyn-Koźle
- Gmina: Cisek

Population
  - Total: 270
- Postal code: 47-253
- Vehicle registration: OK

Błażejowice ([bwaʐɛjɔˈvit͡sɛ], additional name in German: Blaseowitz) is a village in the administrative district of Gmina Cisek, within Kędzierzyn-Koźle County, Opole Voivodeship, in southern Poland.

== Etymology ==
The name of the village comes from the Polish male name Błażej. It was noted under its Polish name Błażejowice in the Geographical Dictionary of the Kingdom of Poland from 1880 and in Konstanty Damrot's work on the origins of place names in Silesia from 1896.
