= Jacob Heinrich von Flemming =

Saxon count and politician

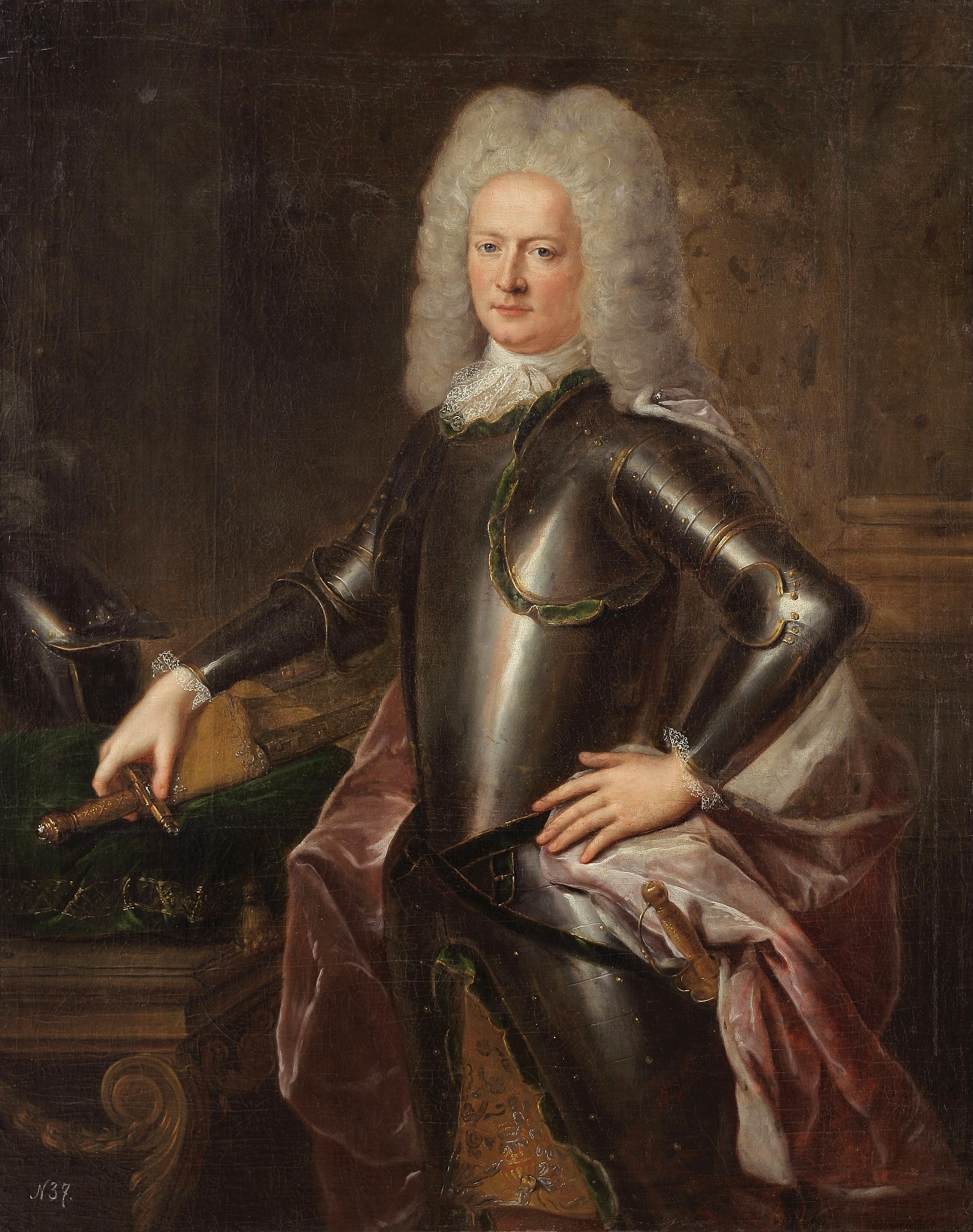
- Portrait by an unknown artist from the 1720s
- Born: March 3, 1667; Trzęsacz
- Died: April 30, 1728 (aged 61) Vienna
- Buried: Saint Mary church, Putzkau
- Allegiance: Brandenburg; Saxony; Polish–Lithuanian Commonwealth
- Rank: Field marshal
- Conflicts: Nine Years' War; Great Northern War
- Spouses: Franciszka Sapieha (m. 1702; div. 1718) Tekla Róża Radziwiłłówna (m. 1725)

Jakob Heinrich von Flemming (3 March 1667 – 30 April 1728) was a Saxon count, Saxon and Polish military officer and politician. He served as the Polish General of the artillery, Polish-Saxon field marshal, Grand Koniuszy of Lithuania, and Polish diplomat to the Kingdom of Great Britain. He took part in the Nine Years' War and Great Northern War.

== Early life ==
He was born in Hoff, Prussian Province of Pomerania (now Trzęsacz, Poland) to a noble family. He attended school in Greifswald, and then attended university in Frankfurt (Oder), Utrecht, Leiden and Oxford.

== Military and political career ==
He completed his law studies in 1688, after which he entered service with Brandenburg. He took part as an officer in the Nine Years' War, and in 1693 he was part of an English unit in northern Italy. In 1694, he entered service with Saxony as a colonel, and achieved fast promotions in the Saxon army in the following years.

He was appointed ambassador to Warsaw by elector Frederick Augustus of Saxony, who aspired to the throne of Poland–Lithuania which had been vacant since the death of John III Sobieski in 1696. By causing competition between the other aspirants, Flemming was able to secure the election of the elector as Augustus II of Poland–Lithuania.

Flemming participated in the Livonian campaign of the Great Northern War. His troops captured the fort of Düna at Riga from the Swedes in 1700, renaming it "Augustenburg" ("August's fort"), but the Swedes defeated the allied Russian-Saxon army at the crossing of the Daugava in 1701. During the Battle of Kliszów in 1702 he was severely wounded.

In 1705 August made him general of the cavalry and Minister of War. At the Treaty of Altranstädt in 1706, Charles XII demanded of the deposed August the extradition of Flemming, arguing that he had estates in Swedish Pomerania and was therefore a Swedish citizen subject to Swedish law. Flemming relieved his Elector from this predicament by leaving for Prussia. When the Swedes left Poland in 1708 for their disastrous campaign in Russia (ending with the defeat at Poltava), the re-crowned August installed Flemming in the governor's residence in Dresden.

In 1711 Flemming became Generalfeldmarschall and led the Saxon troops in northern Germany against the Swedes led by Magnus Stenbock. He participated in the sieges of Stralsund and Tönning, and led the Saxon troops in the Battle of Gadebusch in 1712.

After the victorious end of fighting in northern Germany in 1715, Flemming led the Saxon troops to Poland, supporting Augustus against the Tarnogród Confederation.

In 1719, he was a Polish envoy to the Kingdom of Great Britain. From 1727 until his death in 1728, he was the starost of Tuchola.

He died in 1728, and was buried in the Saint Mary's church in Putzkau.

== Personal life ==
He was fluent in Polish, French and Latin.

In 1725, he married Tekla Róża Radziwiłłówna of the powerful magnate Radziwiłł family in Biała Podlaska.

== Estates ==
He bought various estates, including Sławięcice and Kotlarnia in 1702, Birkigt in 1718, Świecie in 1719, Crossen an der Elster, Posterstein and Putzkau in 1724, and Cieszków in 1725. In Kotlarnia, he founded a brass and wire factory.
