= Dziergowice =

Dziergowice Oderwalde
- Village
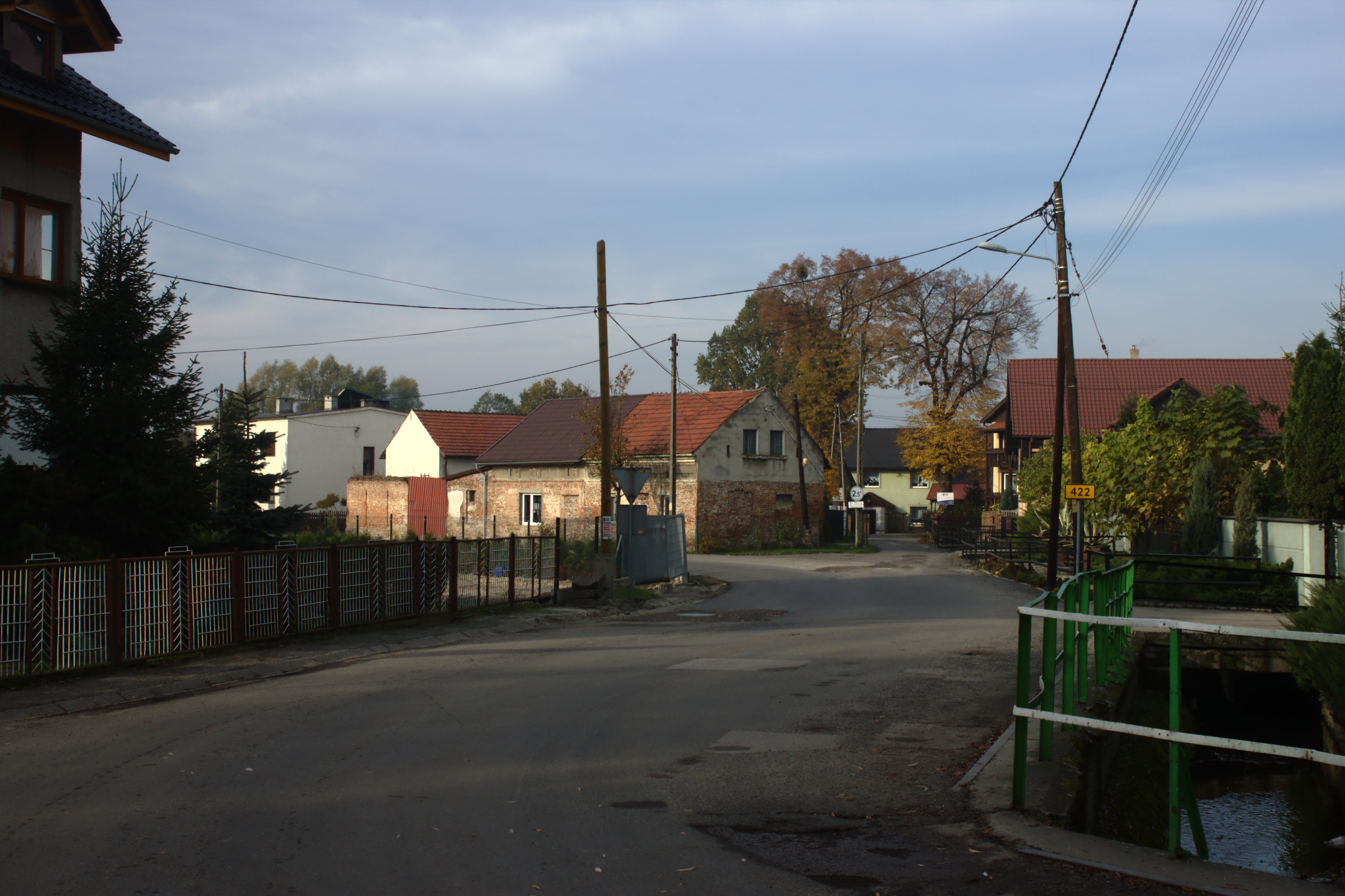
- Road

- Location within Poland
- Coordinates: 50°14′18″N 18°17′7″E
- Country: Poland
- Voivodeship: Opole
- County: Kędzierzyn-Koźle
- Gmina: Bierawa
- Population: 3,000
- Time zone: UTC+1 (CET)
  - Summer (DST): UTC+2 (CEST)
- Vehicle registration: OK

Dziergowice ([d͡ʑɛrɡɔˈvit͡sɛ], additional name in German: Oderwalde) is a village in the administrative district of Gmina Bierawa, within Kędzierzyn-Koźle County, Opole Voivodeship, in southern Poland.

In 2011 the former German name of the village, Oderwalde, was officially re-introduced.
