= Ortowice =

Ortowice Ortowitz
- Village
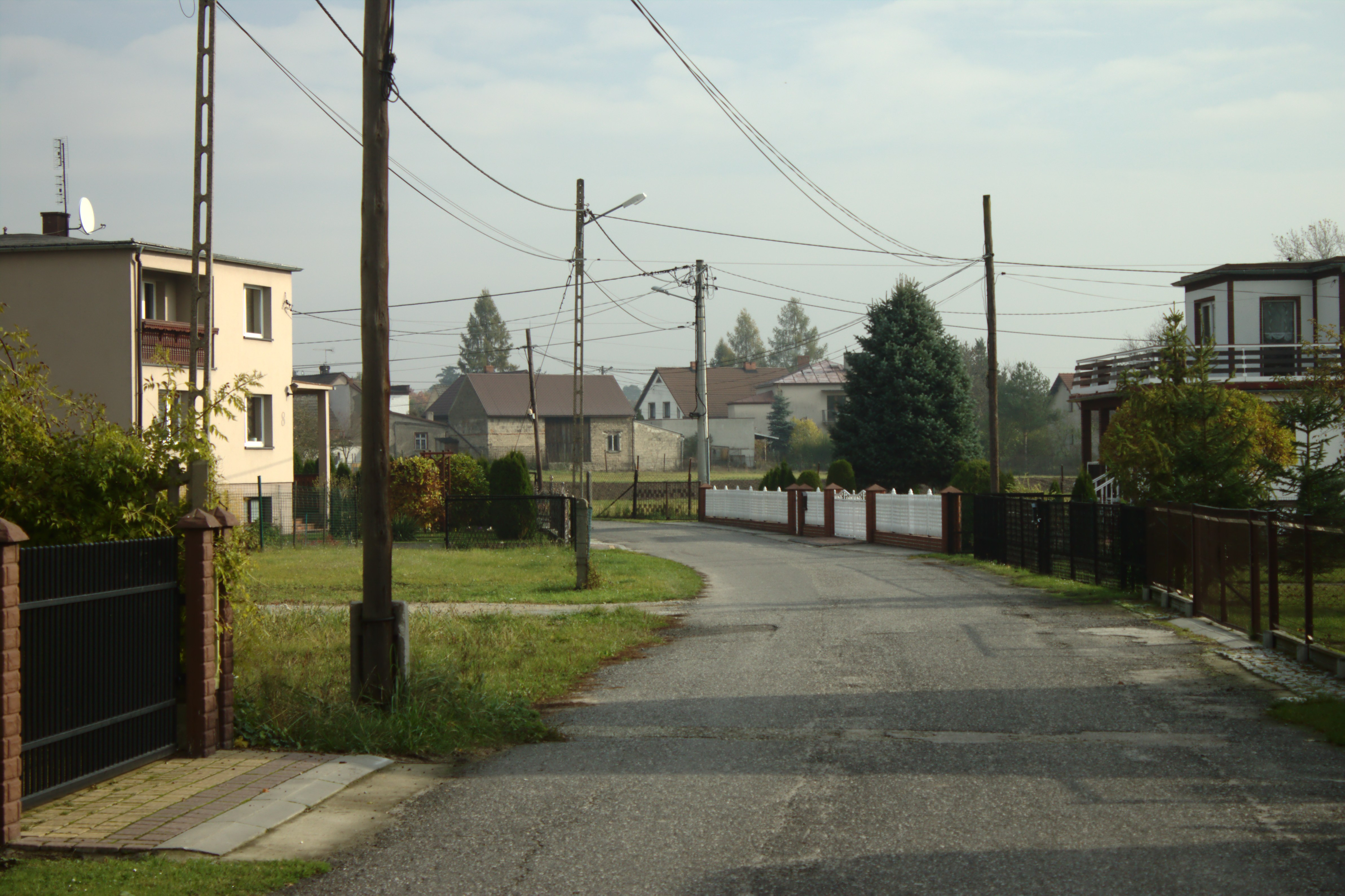
- Street

- Location within Poland
- Coordinates: 50°16′55″N 18°19′10″E
- Country: Poland
- Voivodeship: Opole
- County: Kędzierzyn-Koźle
- Gmina: Bierawa
- Population: 285
- Time zone: UTC+1 (CET)
  - Summer (DST): UTC+2 (CEST)
- Vehicle registration: OK

Ortowice ([ɔrtɔˈvit͡sɛ], additional name in German: Ortowitz) is a village in the administrative district of Gmina Bierawa, within Kędzierzyn-Koźle County, Opole Voivodeship, in southern Poland.
