= Goszyce, Opole Voivodeship =

Goszyce Goschütz
- Village
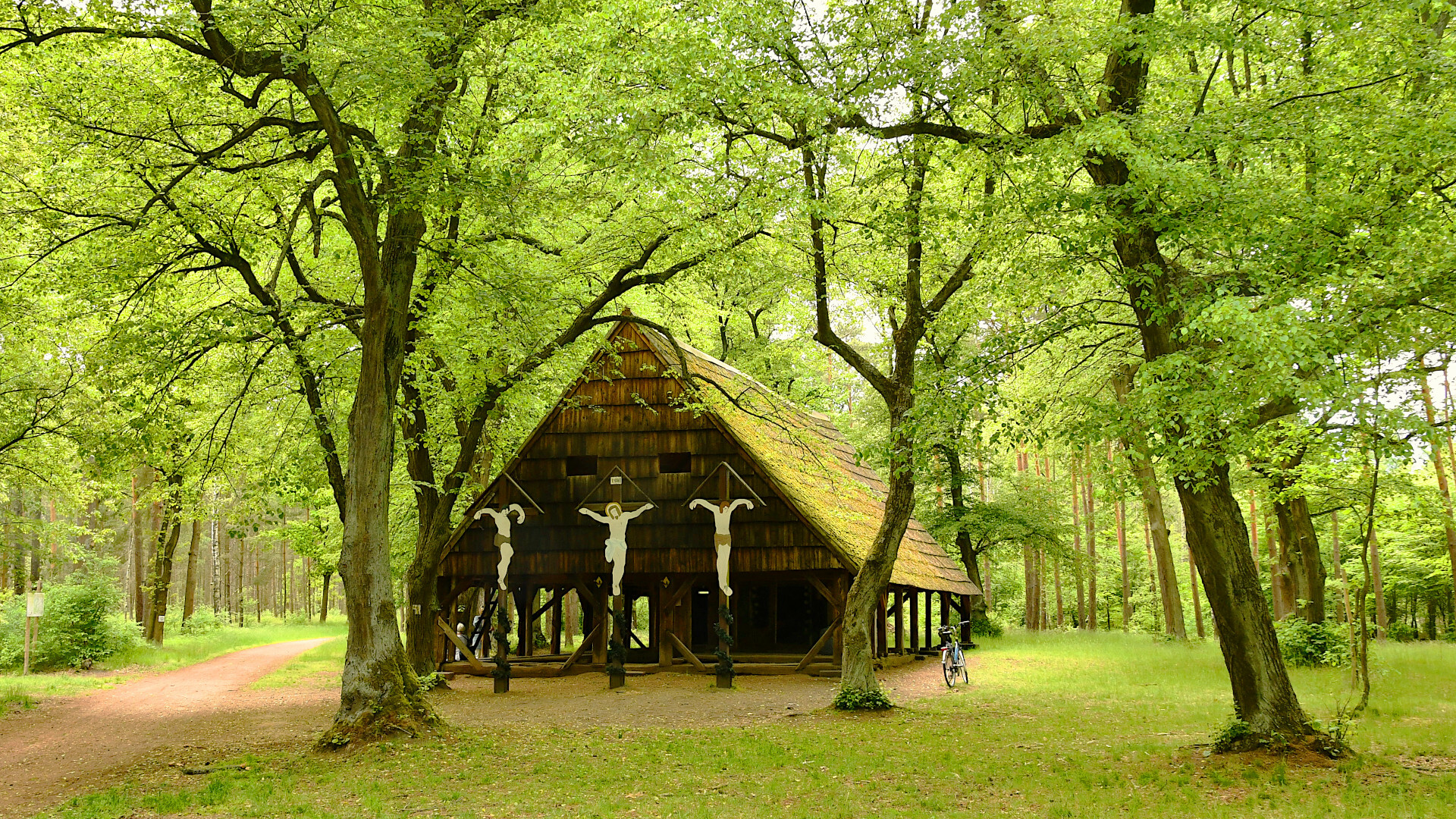
- Chapel

- Location within Poland
- Coordinates: 50°16′4″N 18°24′54″E
- Country: Poland
- Voivodeship: Opole
- County: Kędzierzyn-Koźle
- Gmina: Bierawa

Population
  - Total: 147
- Time zone: UTC+1 (CET)
  - Summer (DST): UTC+2 (CEST)
- Vehicle registration: OK
- Website: http://goszyce.pl/

Goszyce ([ɡɔˈʂɨt͡sɛ], additional name in German: Goschütz) is a village in the administrative district of Gmina Bierawa, within Kędzierzyn-Koźle County, Opole Voivodeship, in southern Poland.
