= Lubieszów, Opole Voivodeship =

Lubieszów Libischau
- Village
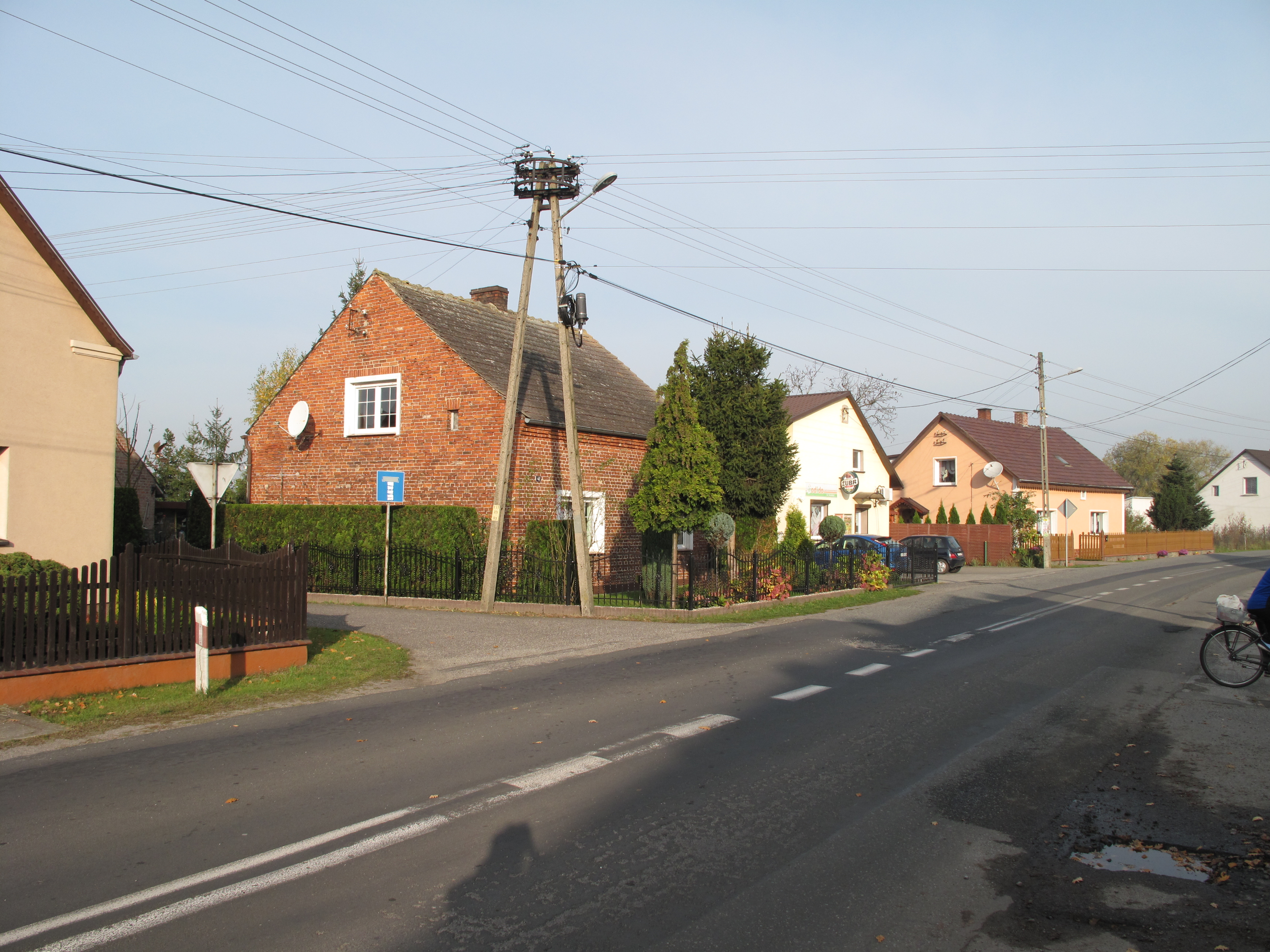
- Houses

- Location within Poland
- Coordinates: 50°15′46″N 18°16′0″E
- Country: Poland
- Voivodeship: Opole
- County: Kędzierzyn-Koźle
- Gmina: Bierawa
- Population: 503
- Time zone: UTC+1 (CET)
  - Summer (DST): UTC+2 (CEST)
- Vehicle registration: OK
- Website: Lubieszow

Lubieszów ([luˈbjɛʂuf], additional name in German: Libischau) is a village in the administrative district of Gmina Bierawa, within Kędzierzyn-Koźle County, Opole Voivodeship, in southern Poland.
