= Kotlarnia =

Kotlarnia Jakobswalde
- Village
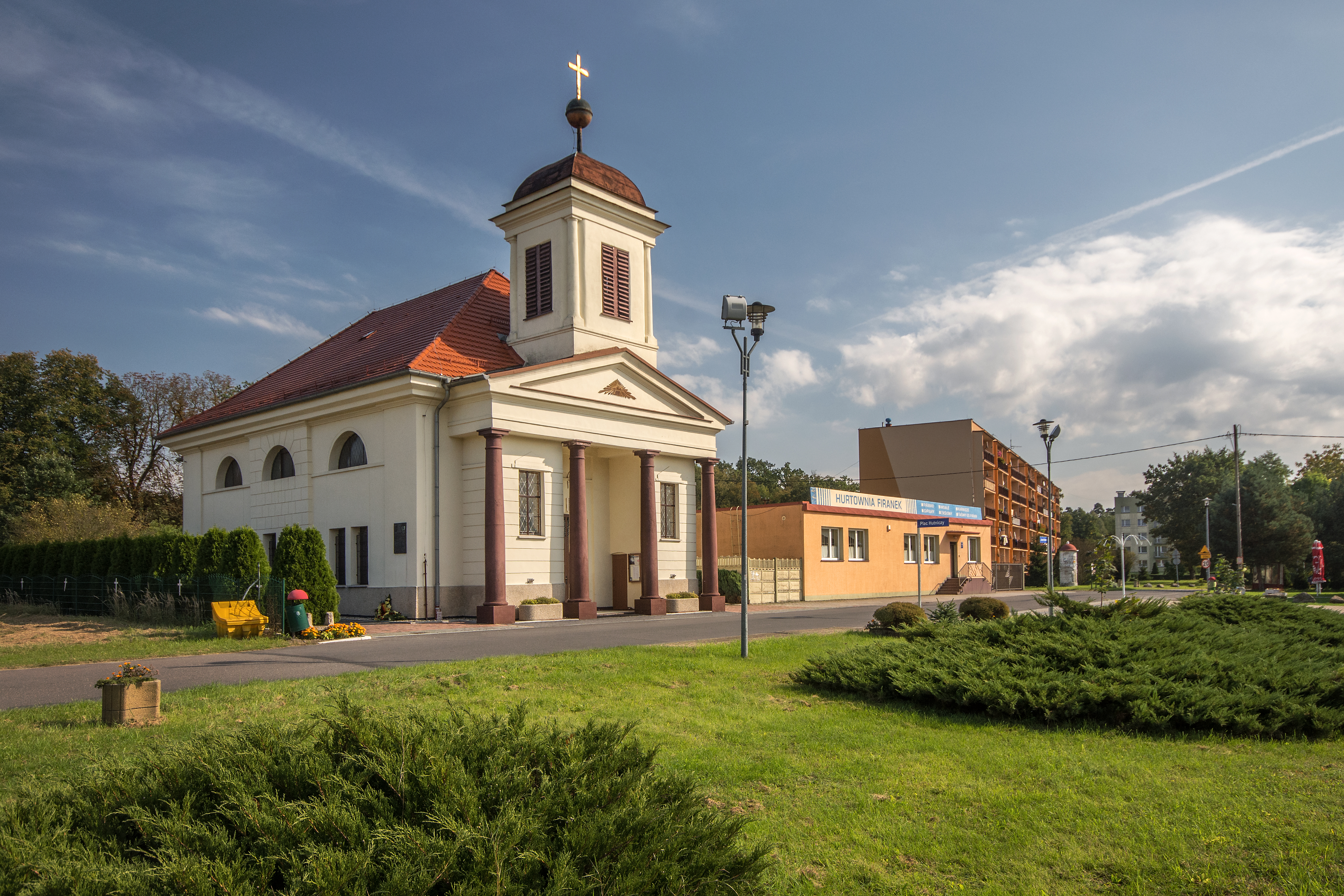
- Saint Maximilian Kolbe church in Kotlarnia

- Location within Poland
- Coordinates: 50°16′N 18°22′E
- Country: Poland
- Voivodeship: Opole
- County: Kędzierzyn-Koźle
- Gmina: Bierawa
- Population: 743
- Time zone: UTC+1 (CET)
  - Summer (DST): UTC+2 (CEST)
- Vehicle registration: OK

Kotlarnia ([kɔˈtlarɲa], additional name in German: Jakobswalde) is a village in the administrative district of Gmina Bierawa, within Kędzierzyn-Koźle County, Opole Voivodeship, in southern Poland.

== History ==
In the 10th century the area became part of the emerging Polish state, and later on, it was part of Poland, Bohemia (Czechia), Prussia, and from 1871 Germany. In 1702 Jacob Heinrich von Flemming, minister of Polish King Augustus II the Strong, established a brass and wire factory in the village, and later also mirror and spoon factories, which existed until 1848. In the late 19th century, the village had a population of 954.

During World War II, the Germans operated the E549 forced labour subcamp of the Stalag VIII-B/344 prisoner-of-war camp in the village. British soldiers were imprisoned there, including a group of Jewish Pioneers from the British Army, who volunteered from "The Land of Israel" (also known as "Palestine", which was under the British Mandate at that time). They worked in the forest. Next to them was also a labor camp of Jews that came from Auschwitz. The British prisoners of war shared their food with the starving Jews of Auschwitz. At the end of the war they all had to march from the camp to Germany in what was called the "Death March". After Germany's defeat in the war, in 1945, the region became again part of Poland.
