= Stara Kuźnia =

Stara Kuźnia Klein Althammer
- Village
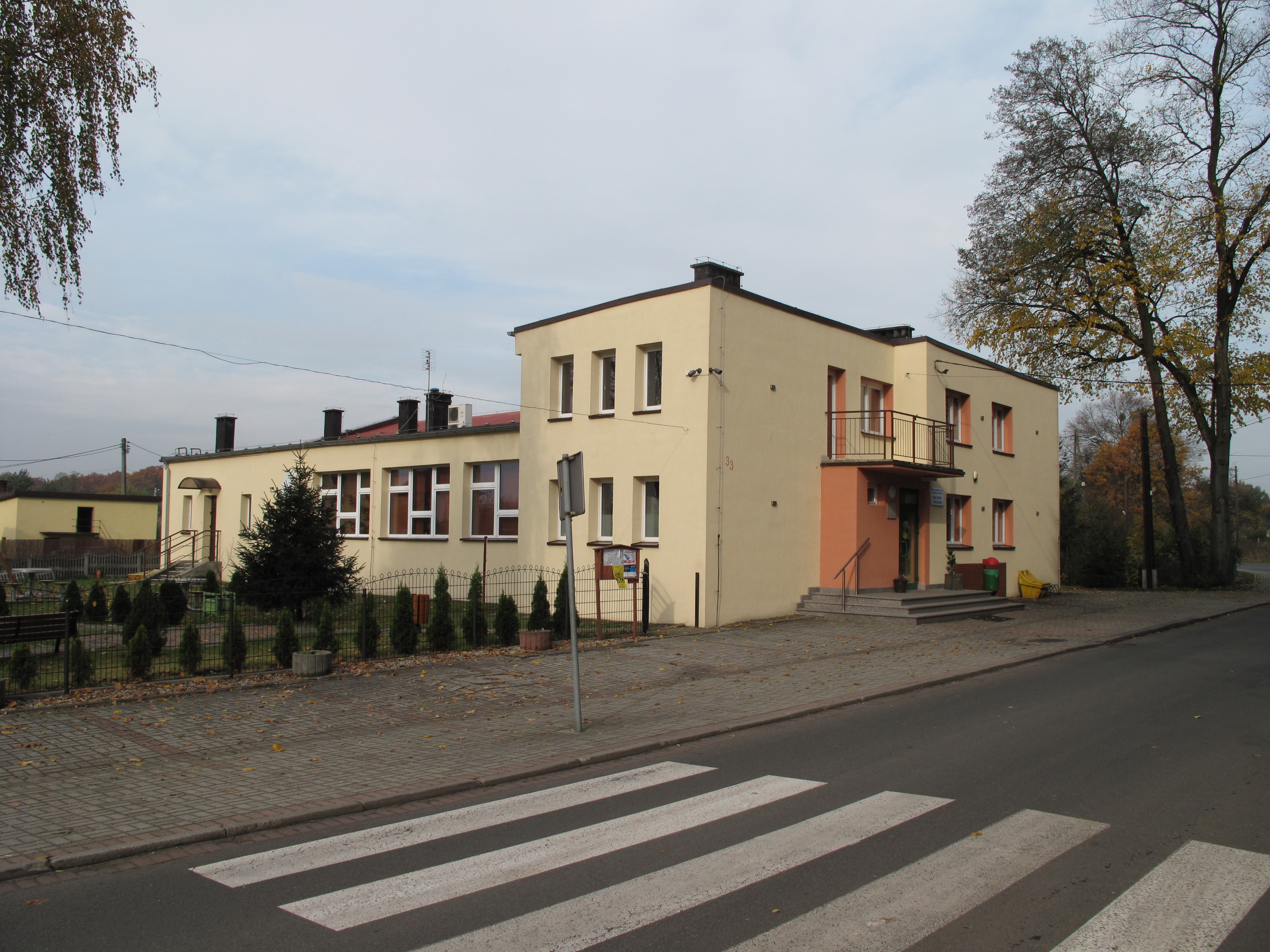
- School

- Location within Poland
- Coordinates: 50°18′0″N 18°20′30″E
- Country: Poland
- Voivodeship: Opole
- County: Kędzierzyn-Koźle
- Gmina: Bierawa
- Population: 691
- Time zone: UTC+1 (CET)
  - Summer (DST): UTC+2 (CEST)
- Vehicle registration: OK

Stara Kuźnia ([ˈstara ˈkuʑɲa], additional name in German: Klein Althammer) is a village in the administrative district of Gmina Bierawa, within Kędzierzyn-Koźle County, Opole Voivodeship, in southern Poland.

== History ==
During the Second World War the village, then known as Klein Althammer, was the base for a working party (E537) of British and Commonwealth prisoners of war, under the administration of the Stalag VIII-B/344 POW camp. In January 1945, as the Soviet armies resumed their offensive and advanced into Germany, the prisoners were marched westward in the so-called Long March or Death March. Many of them died from the bitter cold and exhaustion. The lucky ones got far enough to the west to be liberated by the Allied armies after some four months of travelling on foot in appalling conditions. 61 Polish citizens were murdered by Nazi Germany in the village during World War II.

== Gallery ==
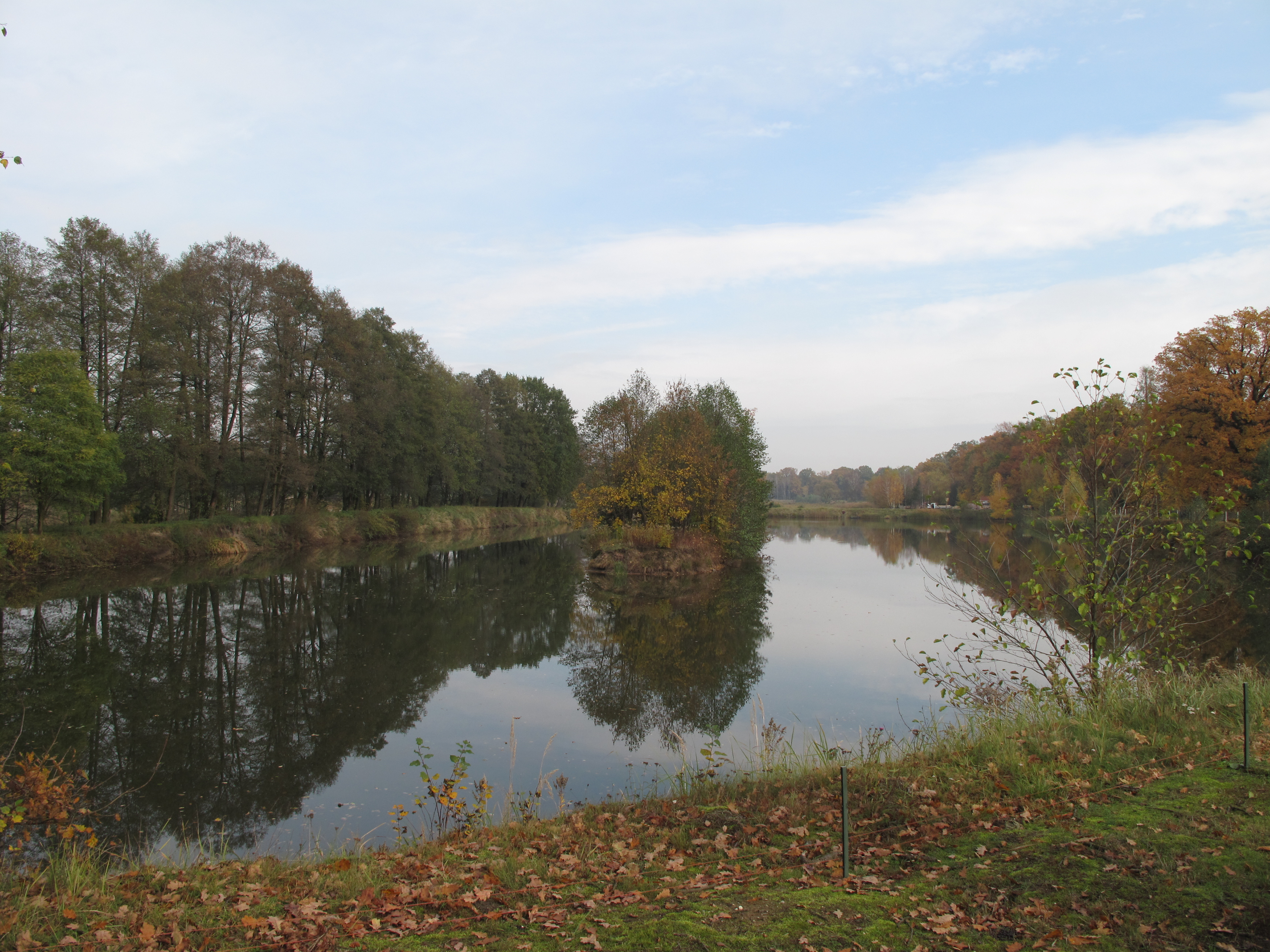
Pond

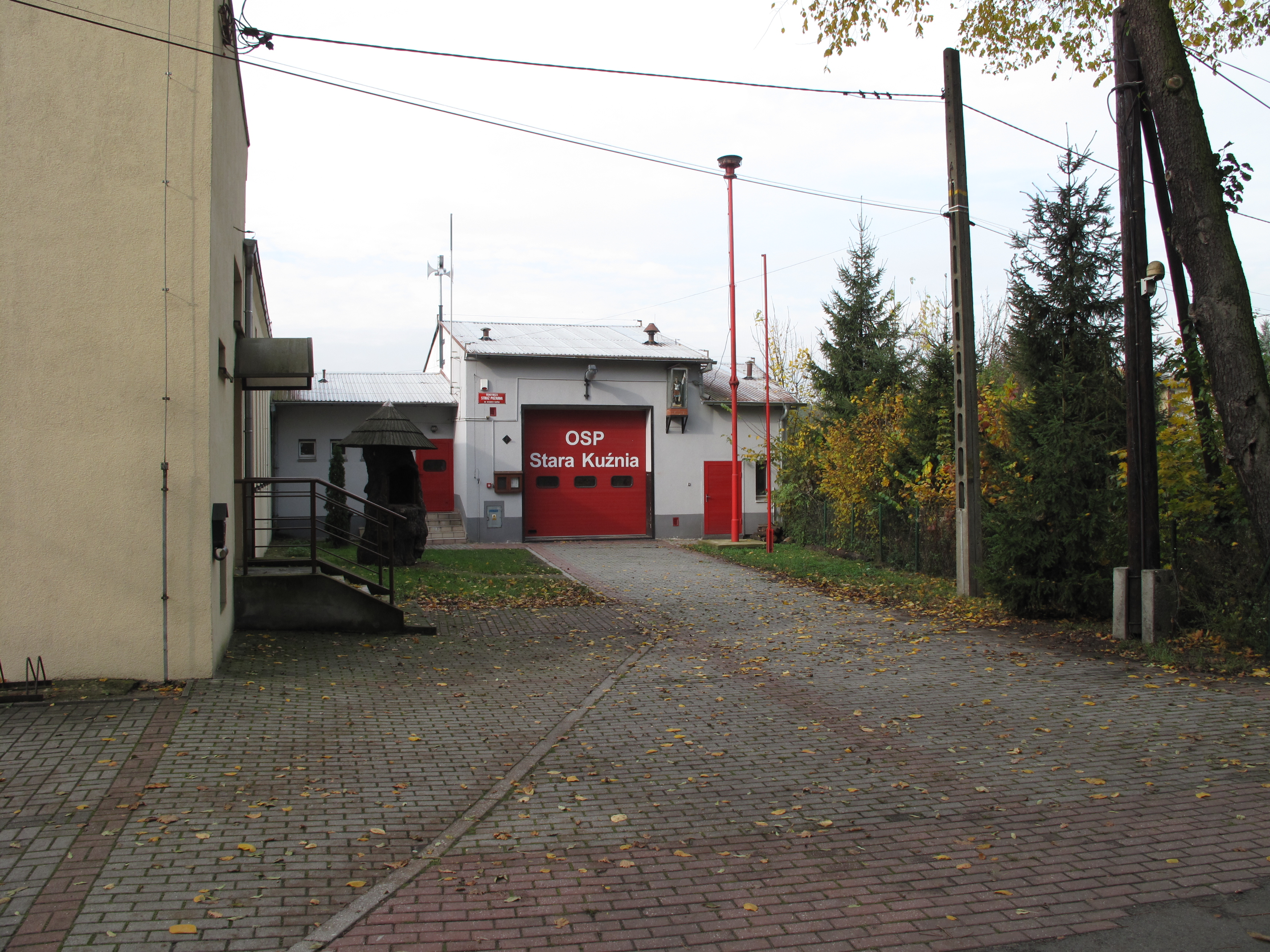
Fire department station

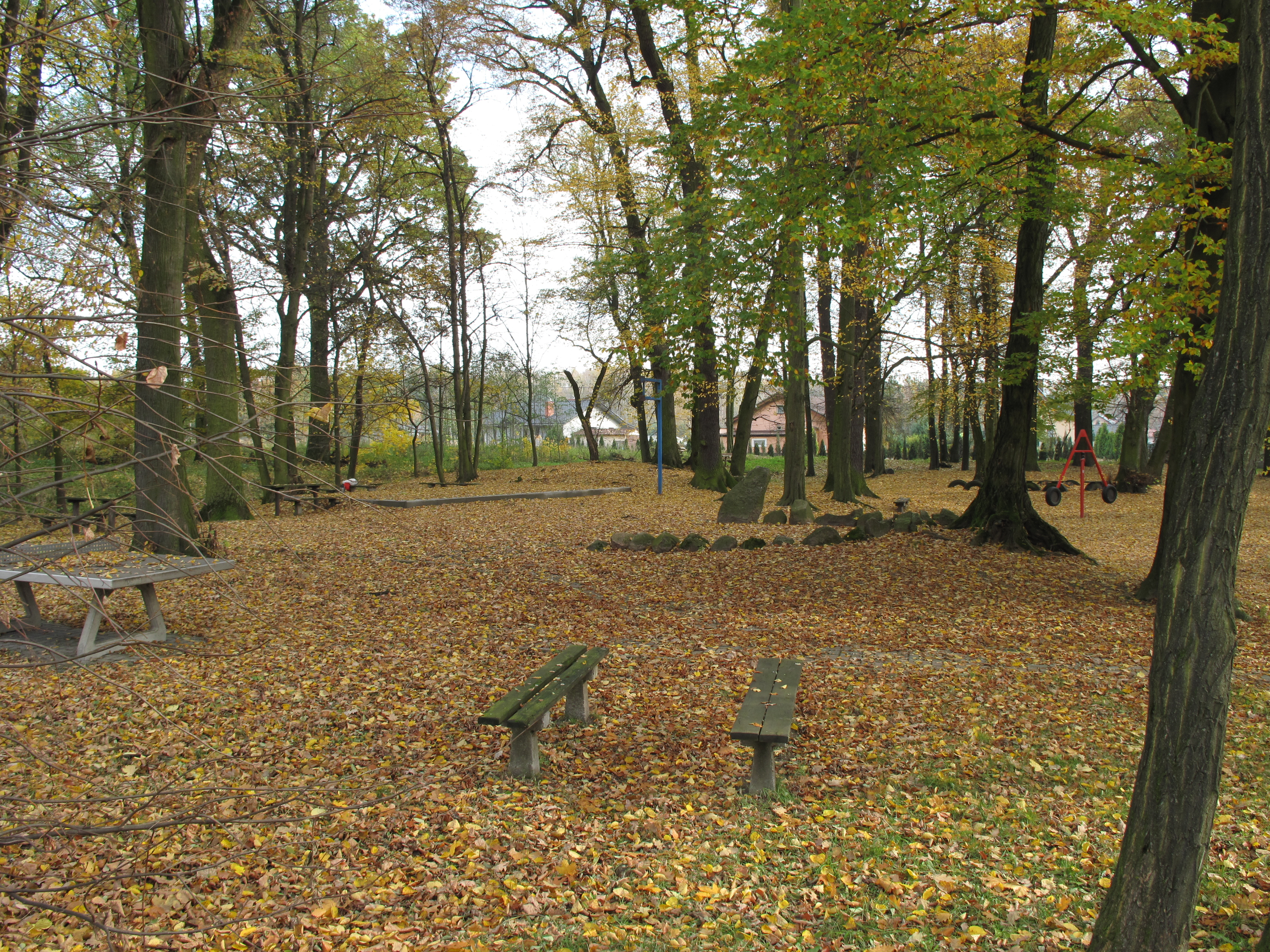
Park
