= Solarnia, Opole Voivodeship =

Solarnia
- Village
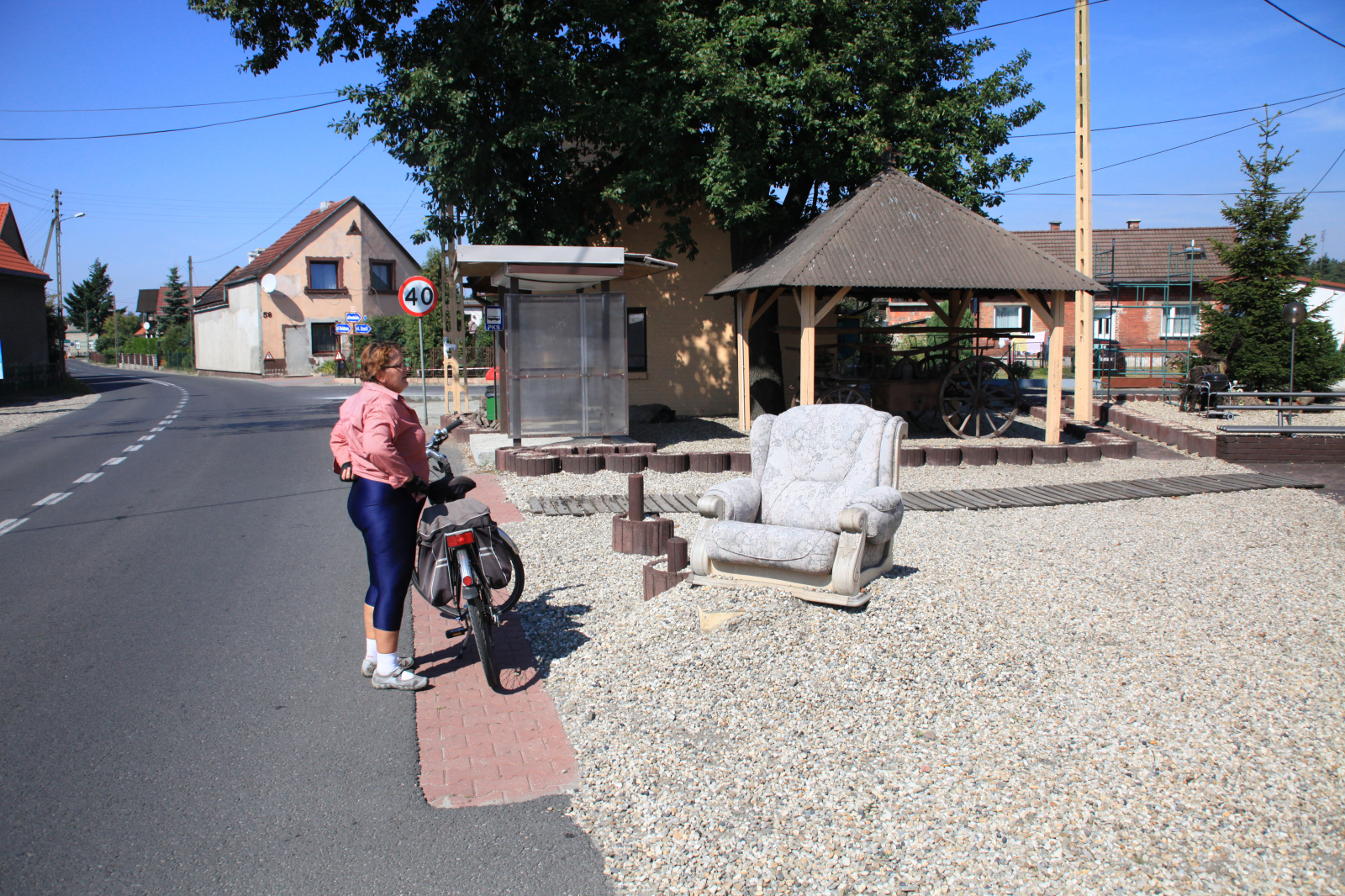

- Location within Poland
- Coordinates: 50°14′8″N 18°18′30″E
- Country: Poland
- Voivodeship: Opole
- County: Kędzierzyn-Koźle
- Gmina: Bierawa
- Population: 532

Solarnia [sɔˈlarɲa] is a village in the administrative district of Gmina Bierawa, within Kędzierzyn-Koźle County, Opole Voivodeship, in south-western Poland.
