= Grabówka, Kędzierzyn-Koźle County =

Grabówka Sackenhoym
- Village
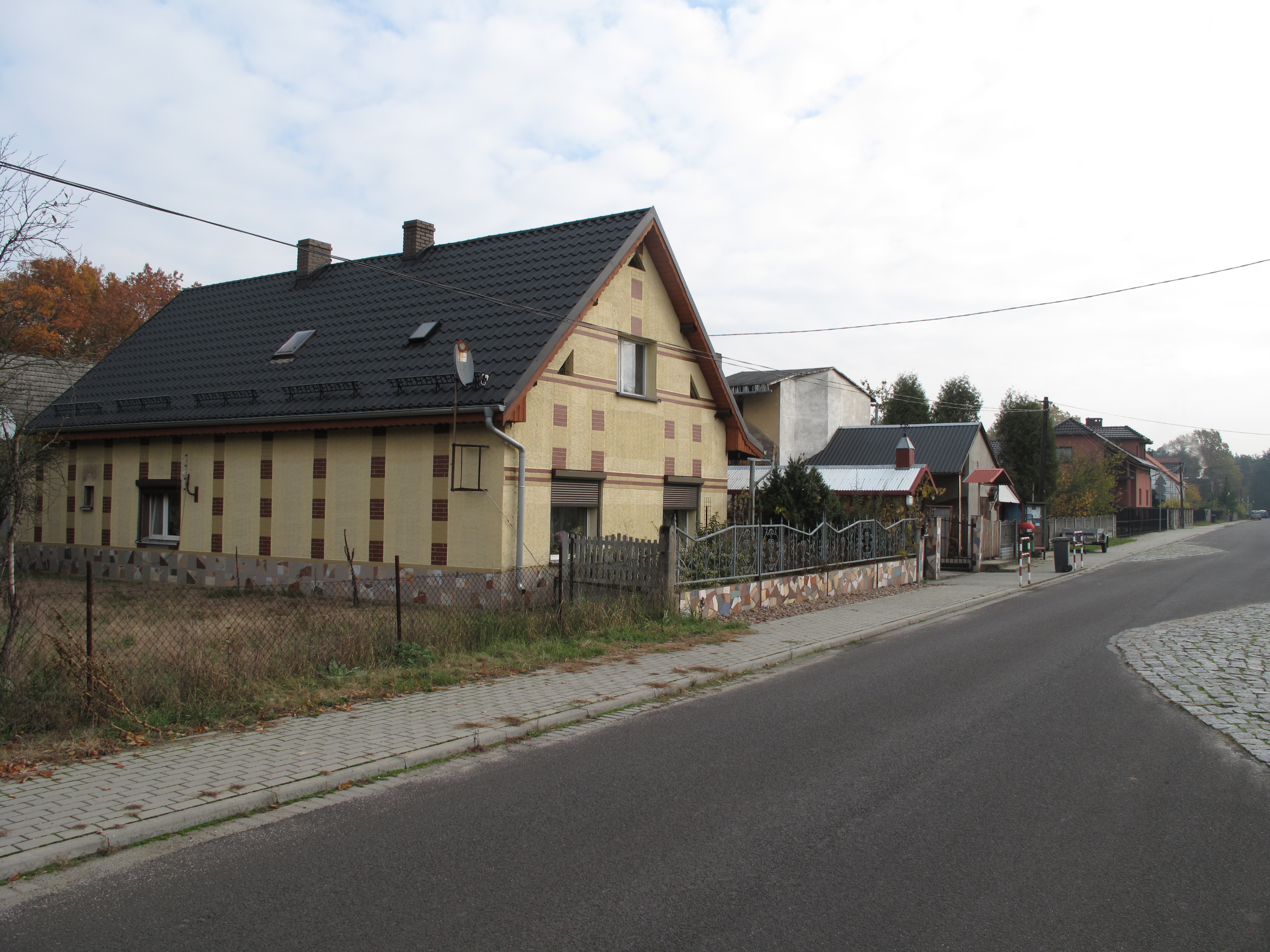
- Street

- Location within Poland
- Coordinates: 50°16′50″N 18°16′27″E
- Country: Poland
- Voivodeship: Opole
- County: Kędzierzyn-Koźle
- Gmina: Bierawa
- Population: 216
- Time zone: UTC+1 (CET)
  - Summer (DST): UTC+2 (CEST)
- Vehicle registration: OK

Grabówka ([ɡraˈbufka], additional name in German: Sackenhoym) is a village in the administrative district of Gmina Bierawa, within Kędzierzyn-Koźle County, Opole Voivodeship, in southern Poland.
