= Brzeźce, Opole Voivodeship =

Brzeźce Brzezetz
- Village
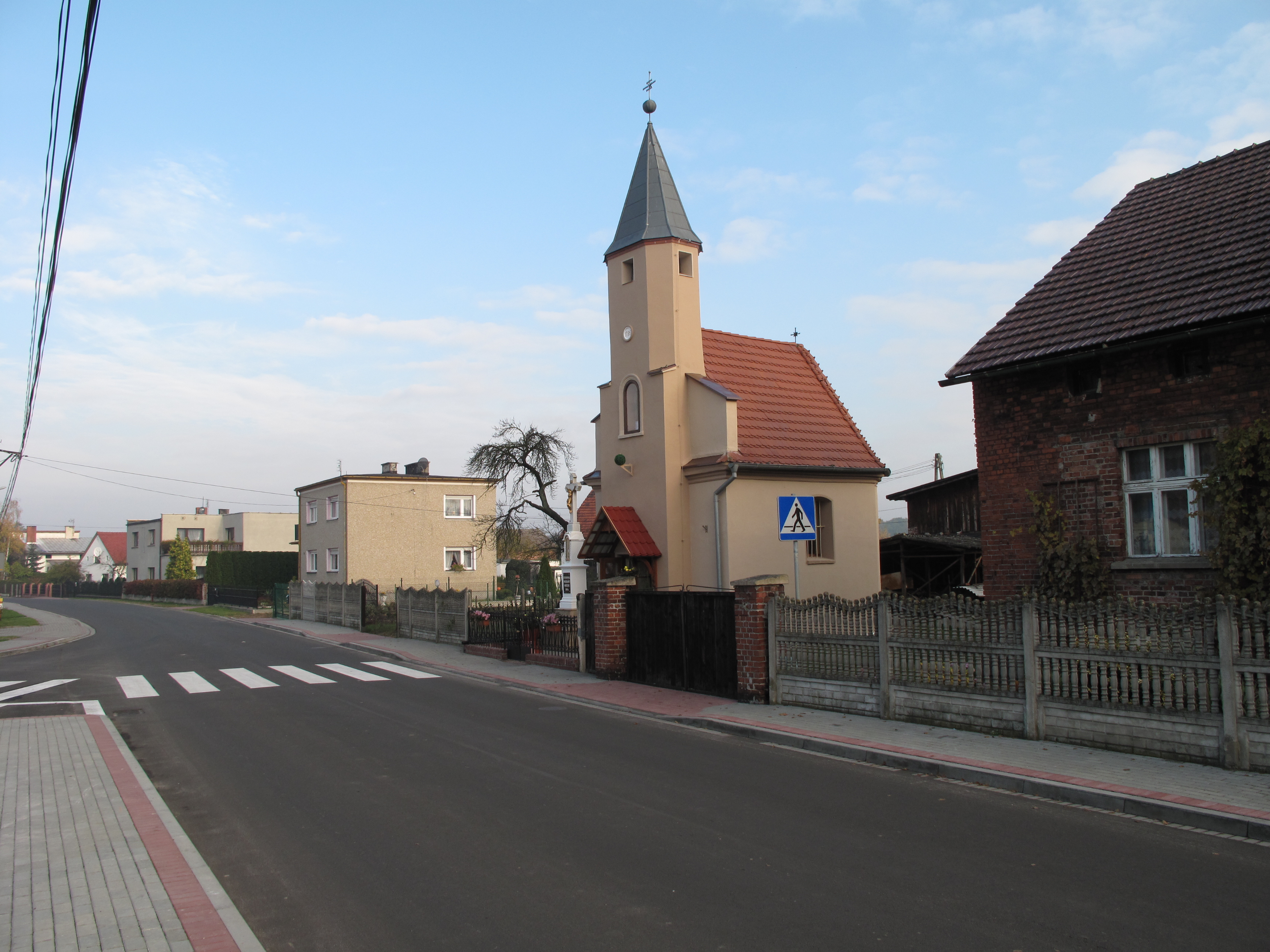
- Chapel in Brzeźce

- Location within Poland
- Coordinates: 50°19′25″N 18°12′30″E
- Country: Poland
- Voivodeship: Opole
- County: Kędzierzyn-Koźle
- Gmina: Bierawa
- Population: 633
- Time zone: UTC+1 (CET)
  - Summer (DST): UTC+2 (CEST)
- Vehicle registration: OK

Brzeźce ([ˈbʐɛɕt͡sɛ], additional name in German: Brzezetz) is a village in the administrative district of Gmina Bierawa, within Kędzierzyn-Koźle County, Opole Voivodeship, in southern Poland.
