= Bierawa =

Bierawa Birawa
- Village
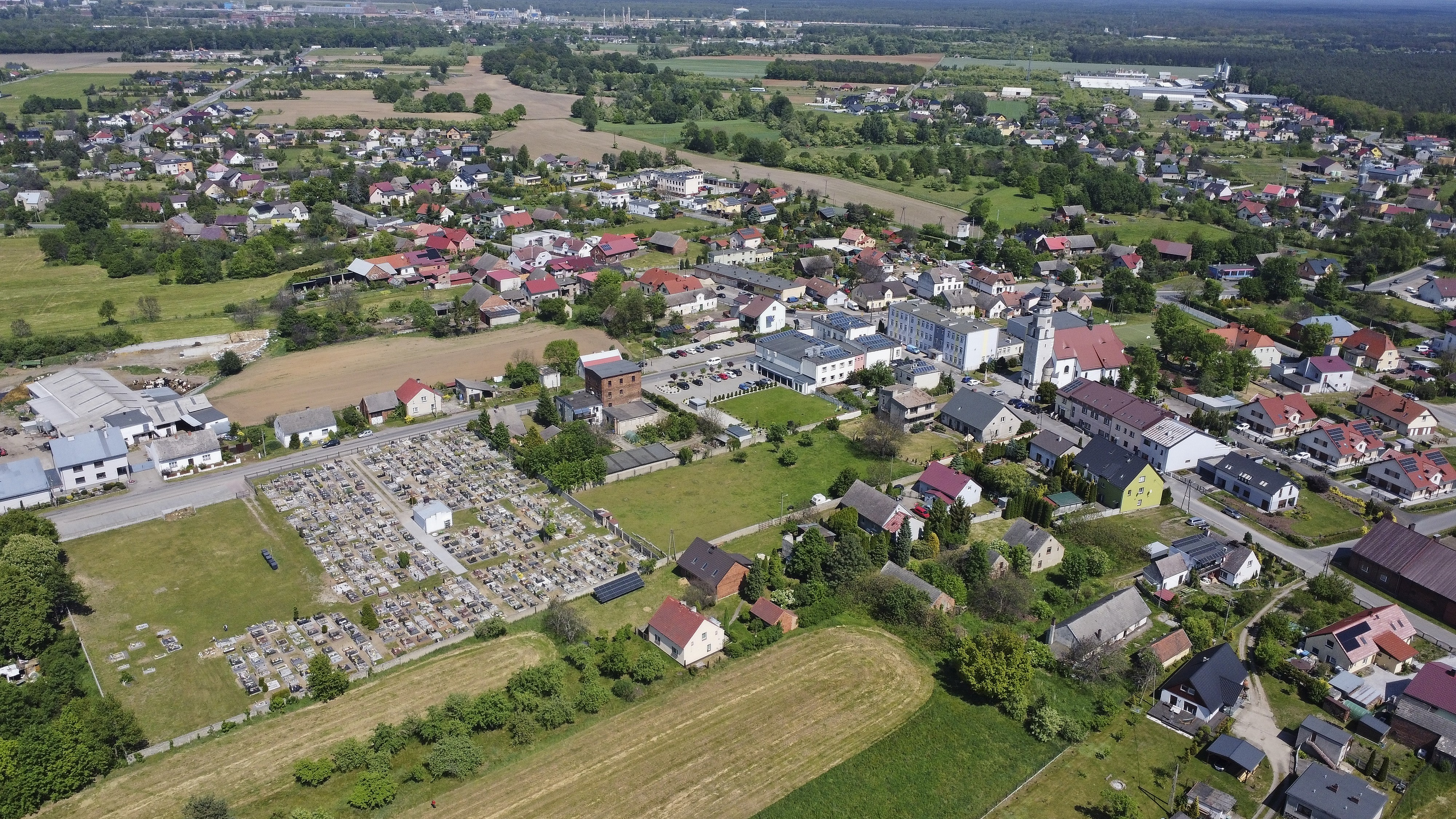
- Aerial view of Bierawa

- Location within Poland
- Coordinates: 50°17′9″N 18°14′32″E
- Country: Poland
- Voivodeship: Opole
- County: Kędzierzyn-Koźle
- Gmina: Bierawa
- Population: 1,370
- Time zone: UTC+1 (CET)
  - Summer (DST): UTC+2 (CEST)
- Vehicle registration: OK
- Website: http://www.bierawa.pl/

Bierawa ([bjɛˈrava], additional name in German: Birawa) is a village in Kędzierzyn-Koźle County, Opole Voivodeship, in southern Poland. It is the seat of the gmina (administrative district) called Gmina Bierawa.

== History ==
The name of the village probably comes from the Polish verb brać, which means "to take". In the Middle Ages it was part of Piast-ruled Poland, and afterwards it was also part of Bohemia (Czechia), Prussia and Germany. In 1936, the German administration changed the name to Reigersfeld in attempt to erase traces of Polish origin. During World War II the Germans operated two forced labour subcamps (E711, E769) of the Stalag VIII-B/344 prisoner-of-war camp in the local IG Farben factory. 18 Polish citizens were murdered by Nazi Germany in the village during World War II. The village became again part of Poland after the defeat of Germany in World War II in 1945, and its historic Polish name was restored.

Bierawa suffered from the 1997 Central European flood.

== Transport ==
There is a train station, located on the Polish Railway Line No. 151 which connects Kędzierzyn-Koźle and the Polish-Czech border at Chałupki.

== Gallery ==
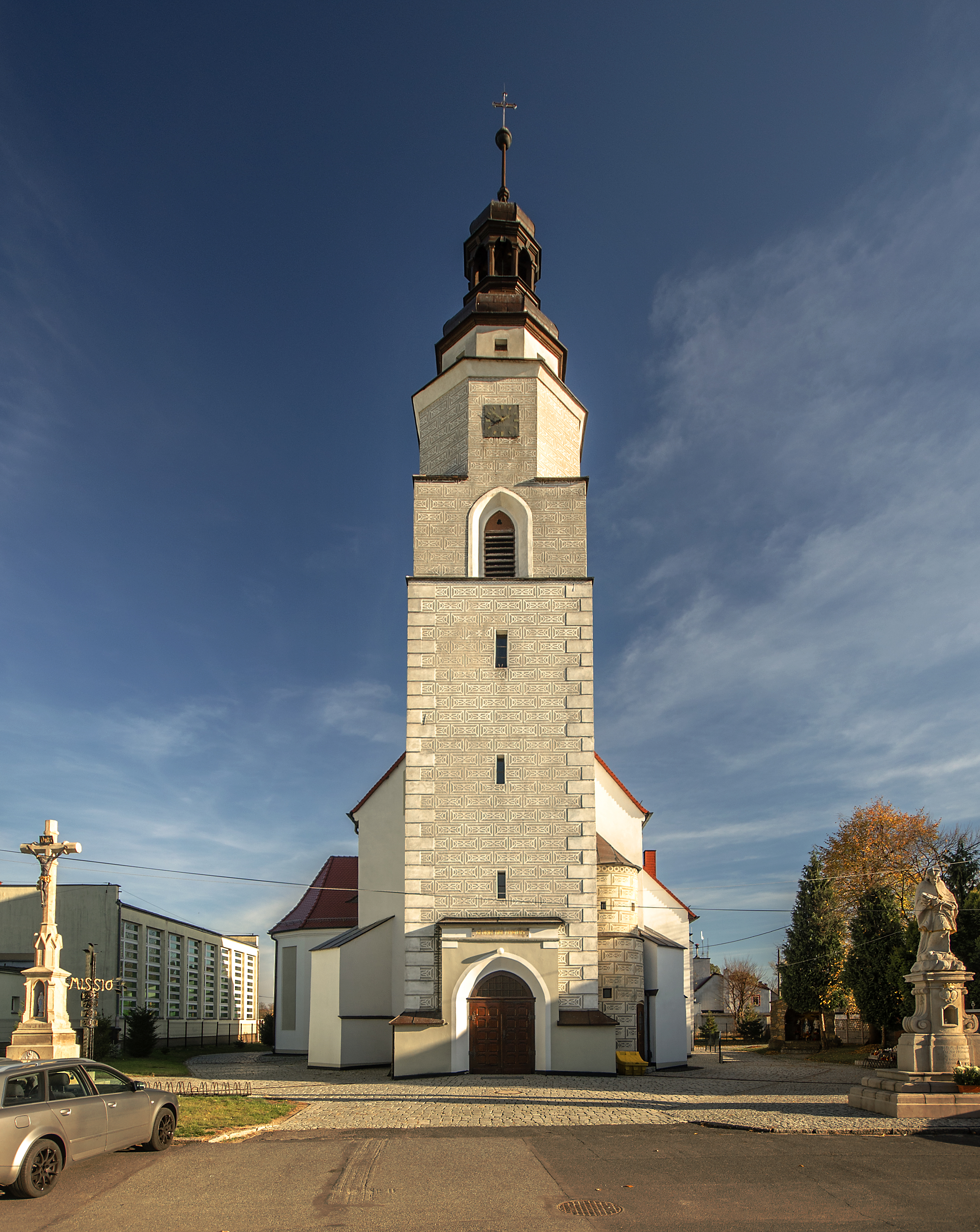
Holy Trinity Church

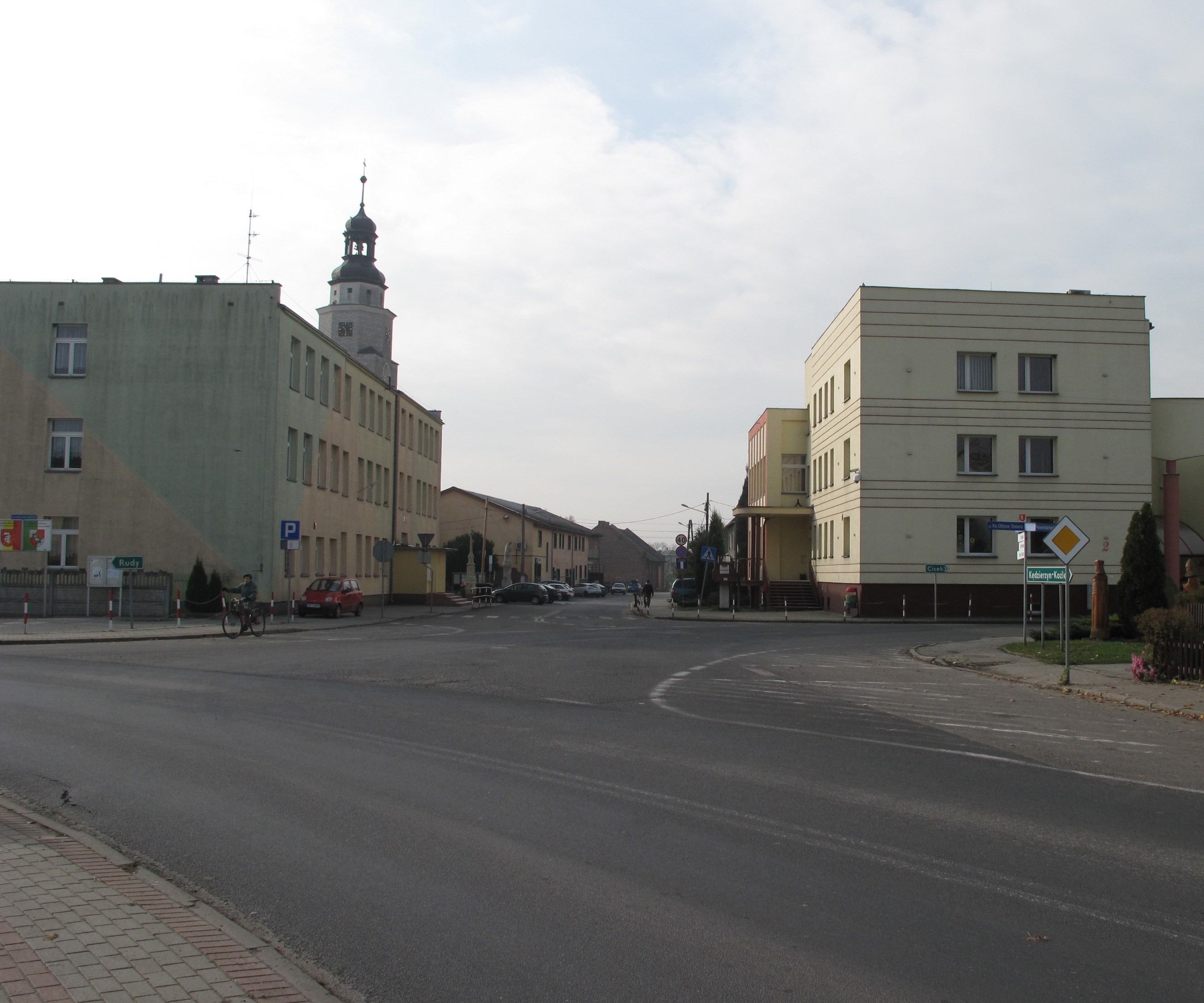
Crossroads with the primary school on the left and the post office on the right

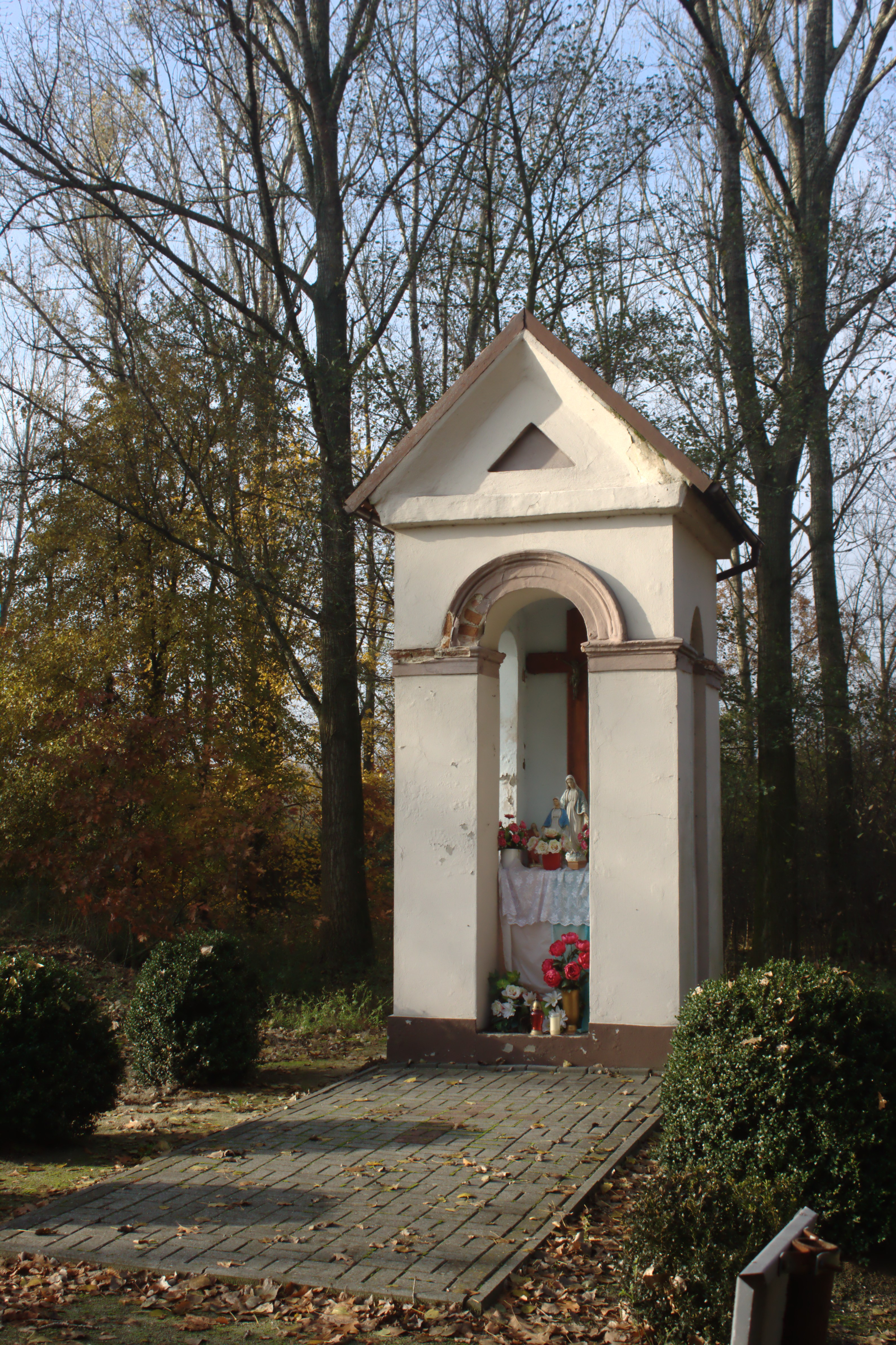
Chapel

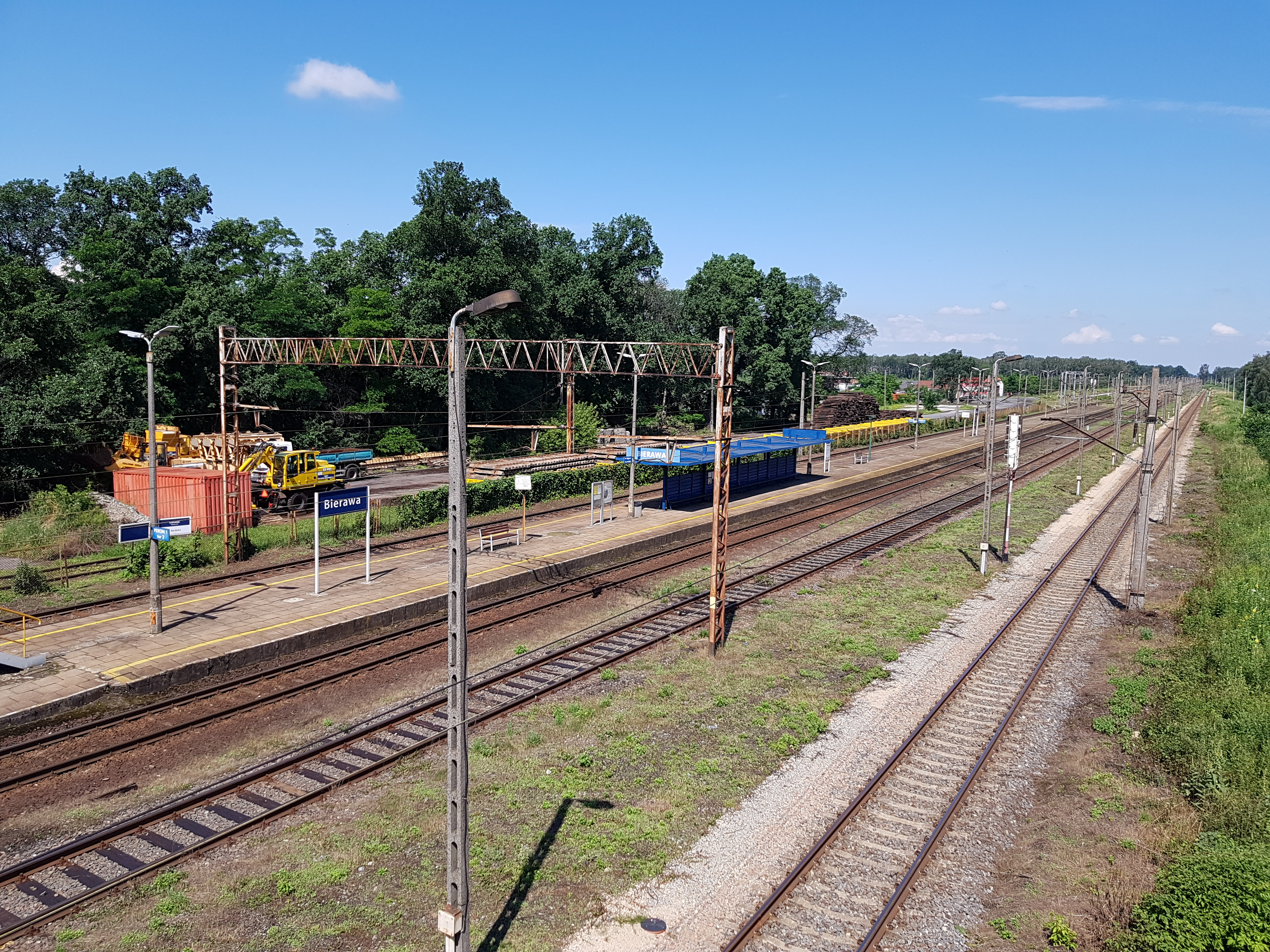
Train station
