= Gmina Bierawa =

Gmina Bierawa Gemeinde Birawa Bierawa Commune
- Gmina
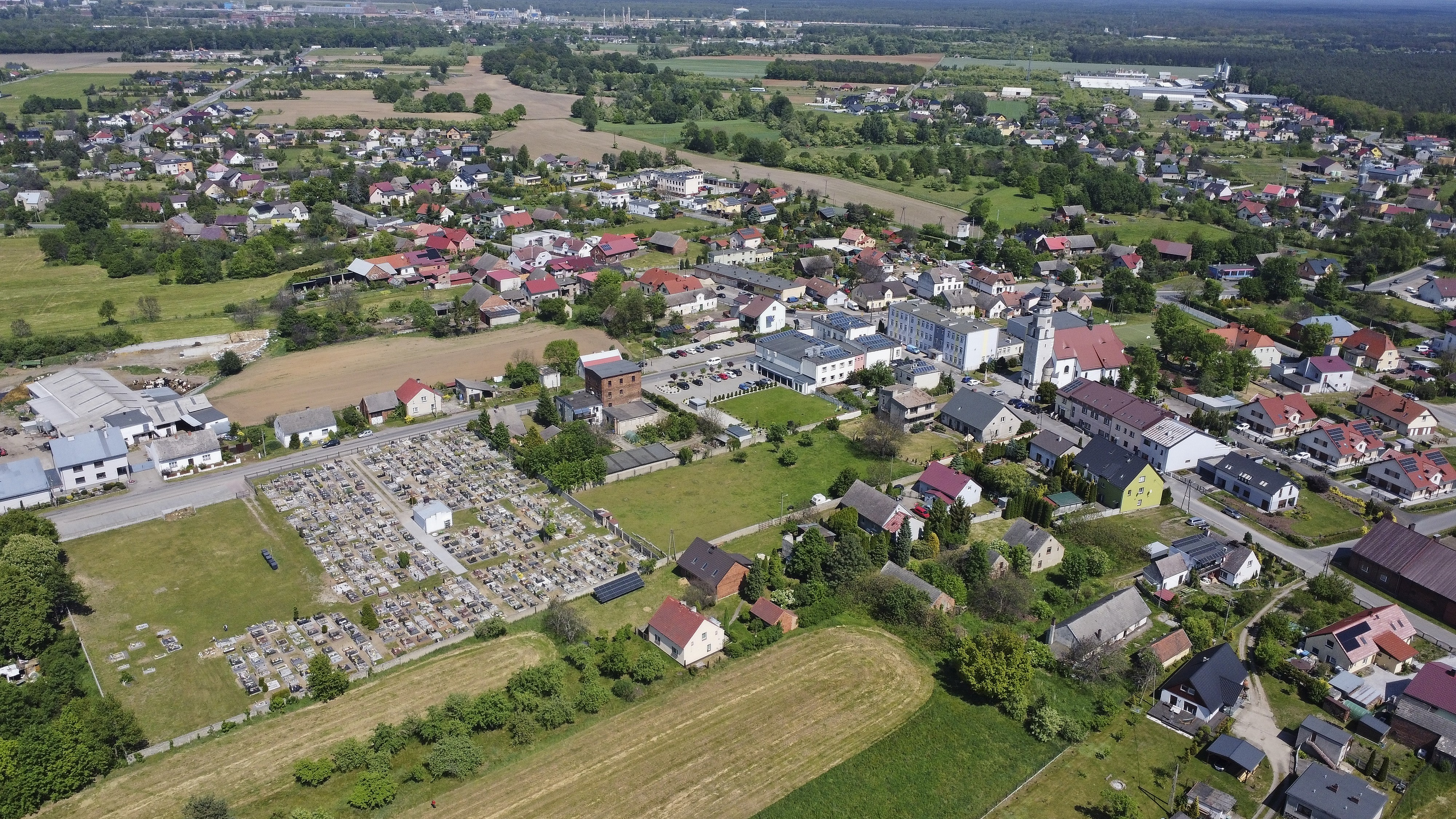
- Aerial view of Bierawa

- Flag Coat of arms
- Interactive map of Gmina Bierawa
- Coordinates (Bierawa): 50°17′9″N 18°14′32″E
- Country: Poland
- Voivodeship: Opole
- County: Kędzierzyn-Koźle
- Seat: Bierawa

Area
  - Total: 119.24 km^{2} (46.04 sq mi)

Population (2019-06-30)
  - Total: 7,910
  - Density: 66.3/km^{2} (172/sq mi)
- Time zone: UTC+1 (CET)
  - Summer (DST): UTC+2 (CEST)
- Vehicle registration: OK
- Website: http://www.bierawa.pl/

Gmina Bierawa (German: Gemeinde Birawa) is a rural gmina (administrative district) in Kędzierzyn-Koźle County, Opole Voivodeship, in southern Poland. Its seat is the village of Bierawa, which lies approximately 8 kilometres (5 mi) south-east of Kędzierzyn-Koźle and 48 km (30 mi) south-east of the regional capital Opole.

The gmina covers an area of 119.24 square kilometres (46.0 sq mi), and as of 2019 its total population was 7,910. Since 2007, the commune, like much of the area, has been officially bilingual in Polish and German.

== Administrative divisions ==
The commune contains the villages and settlements of:

- Bierawa
- Brzeźce
- Dziergowice
- Goszyce
- Grabówka
- Korzonek
- Kotlarnia
- Lubieszów
- Ortowice
- Solarnia
- Stara Kuźnia
- Stare Koźle

== Neighbouring gminas ==
Gmina Bierawa is bordered by the gminas of Kuźnia Raciborska, Rudziniec, Sośnicowice and Toszek.

== Twin towns – sister cities ==
Gmina Bierawa is twinned with:

- Khmilnyk, Ukraine
- Ostfildern, Germany

== Gallery ==
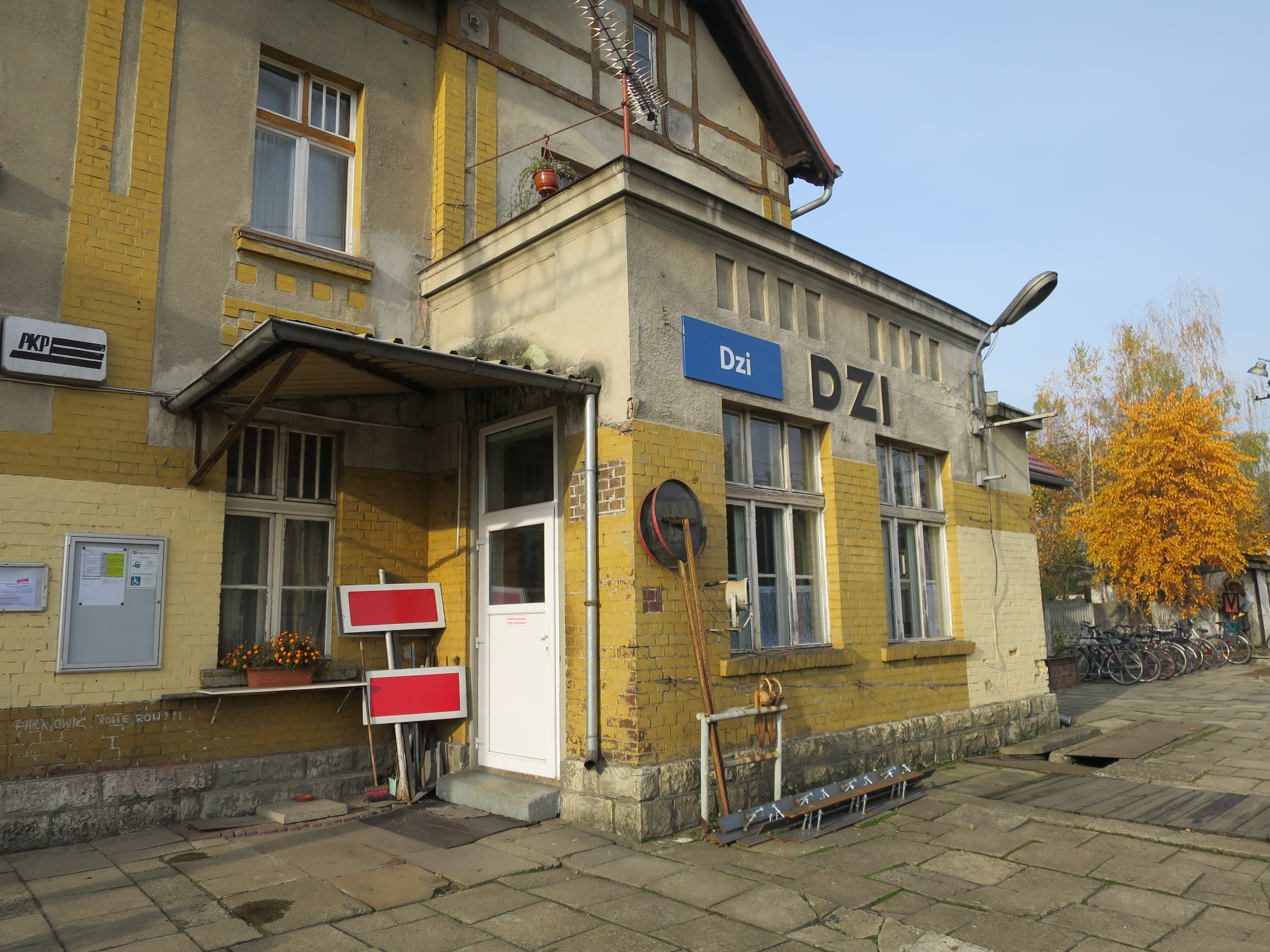
Dziergowice train station

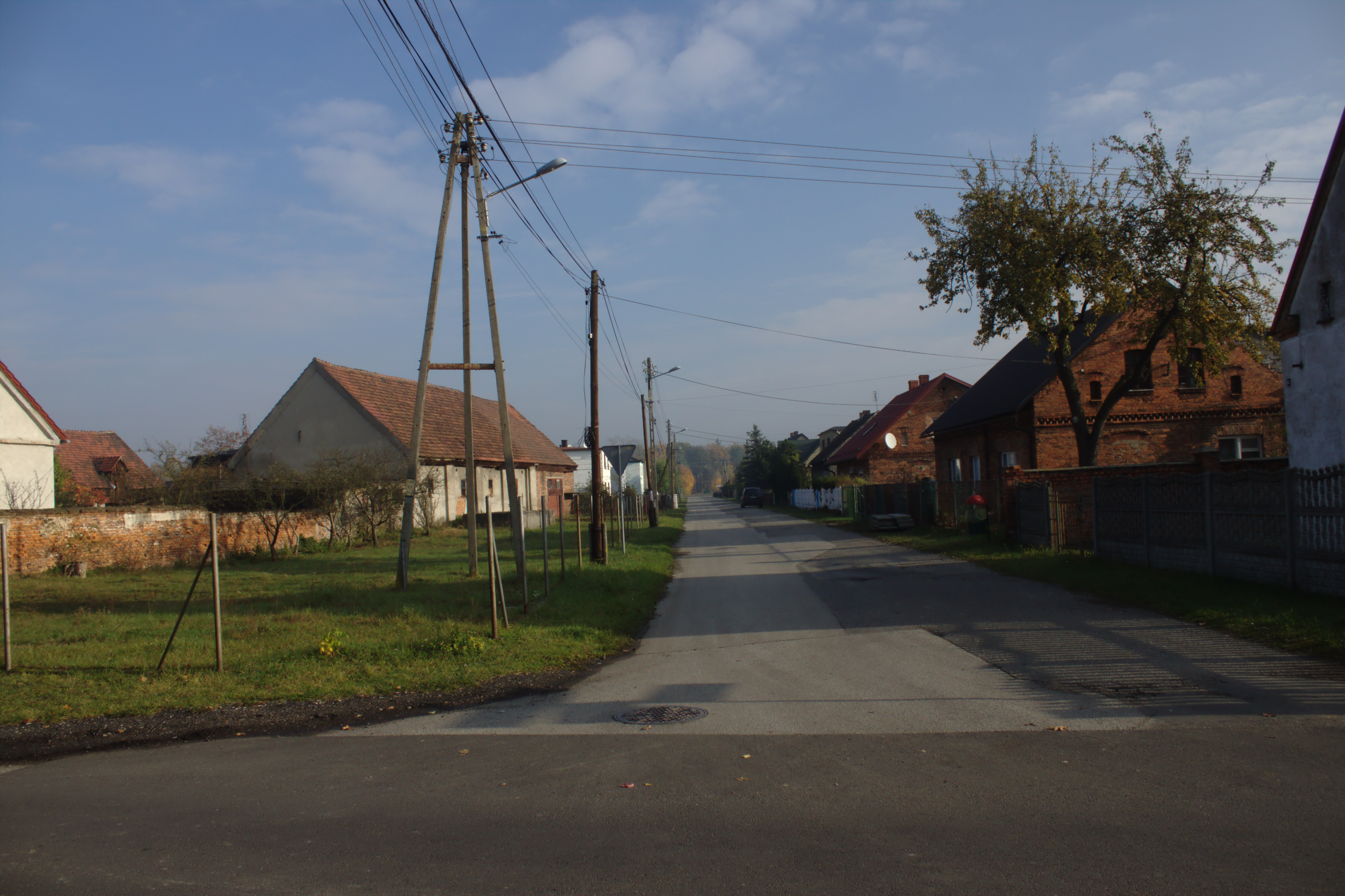
Street in Brzeźce

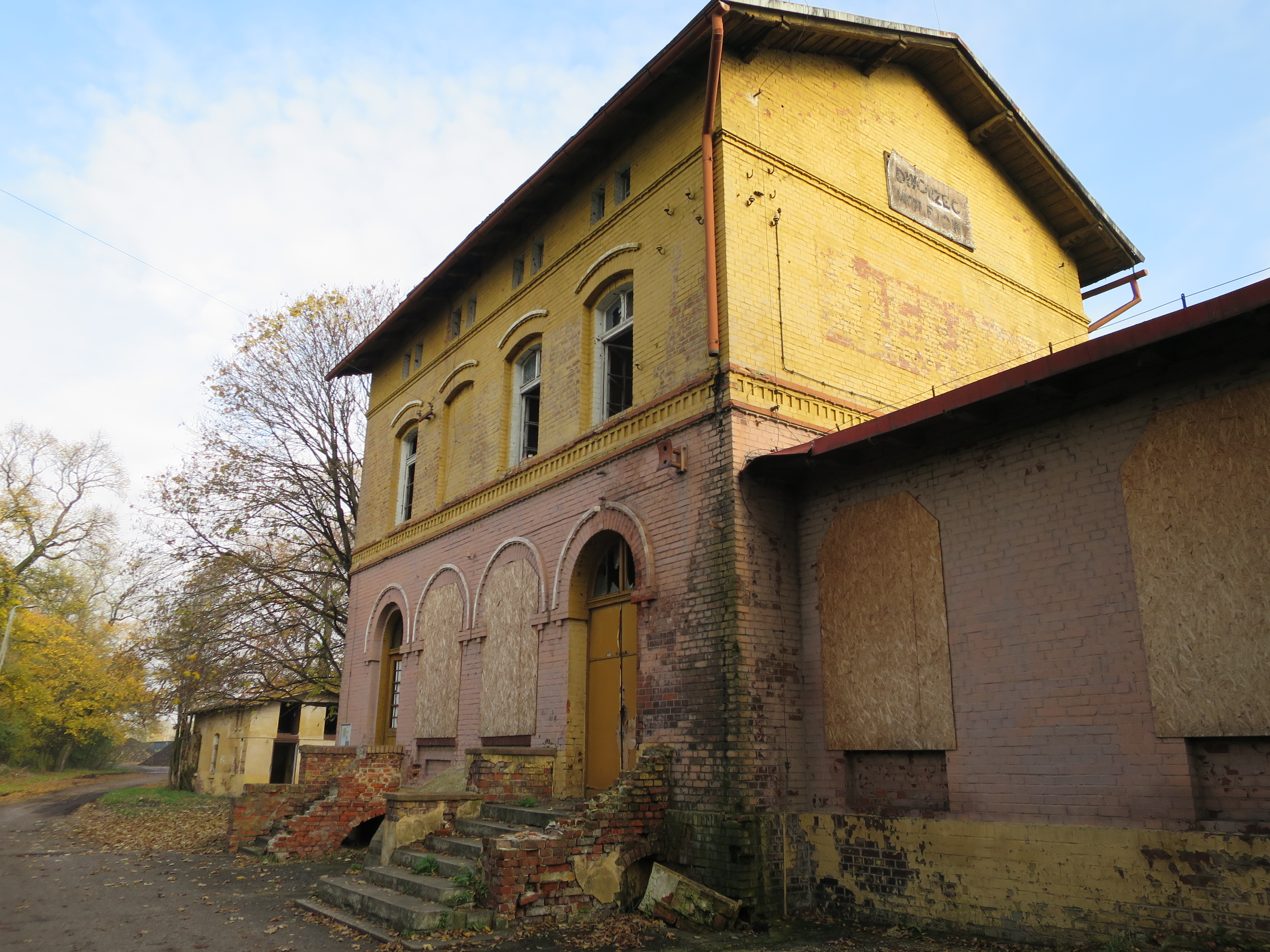
Bierawa train station
