= Stare Koźle =

Stare Koźle Alt Cosel
- Village
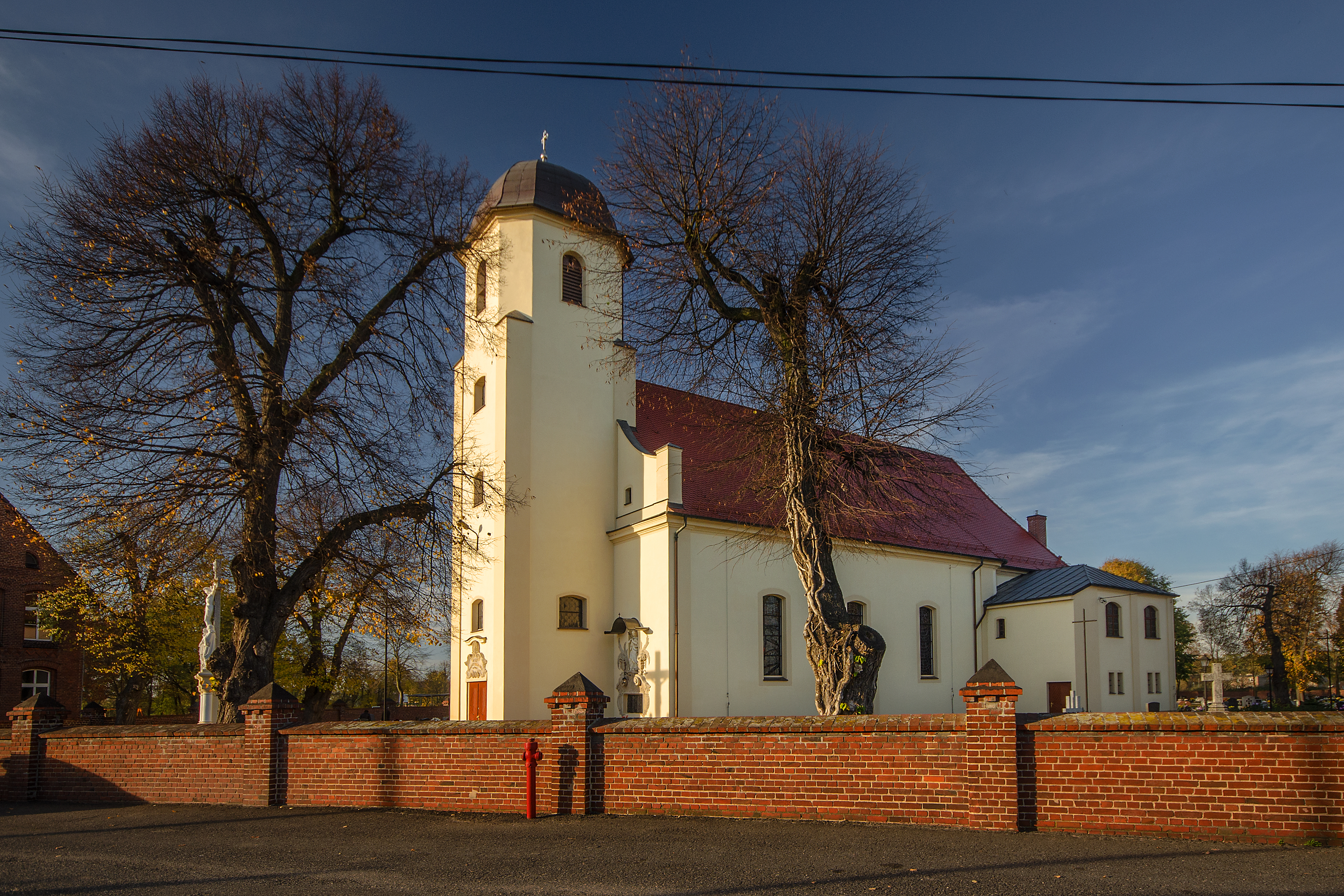
- Saint John of Nepomuk church in Stare Koźle

- Location within Poland
- Coordinates: 50°18′45″N 18°13′25″E
- Country: Poland
- Voivodeship: Opole
- County: Kędzierzyn-Koźle
- Gmina: Bierawa
- First mentioned: 1223

Population
  - Total: 832
- Time zone: UTC+1 (CET)
  - Summer (DST): UTC+2 (CEST)
- Vehicle registration: OK

Stare Koźle ([ˈstarɛ ˈkɔʑlɛ], additional name in German: Alt Cosel) is a village in the administrative district of Gmina Bierawa, within Kędzierzyn-Koźle County, Opole Voivodeship, in southern Poland.

== History ==
In the Upper Silesian plebiscite of 20 March 1921 414 inhabitants voted to remain in Weimar Germany, 236 to rejoin Poland.

== Gallery ==
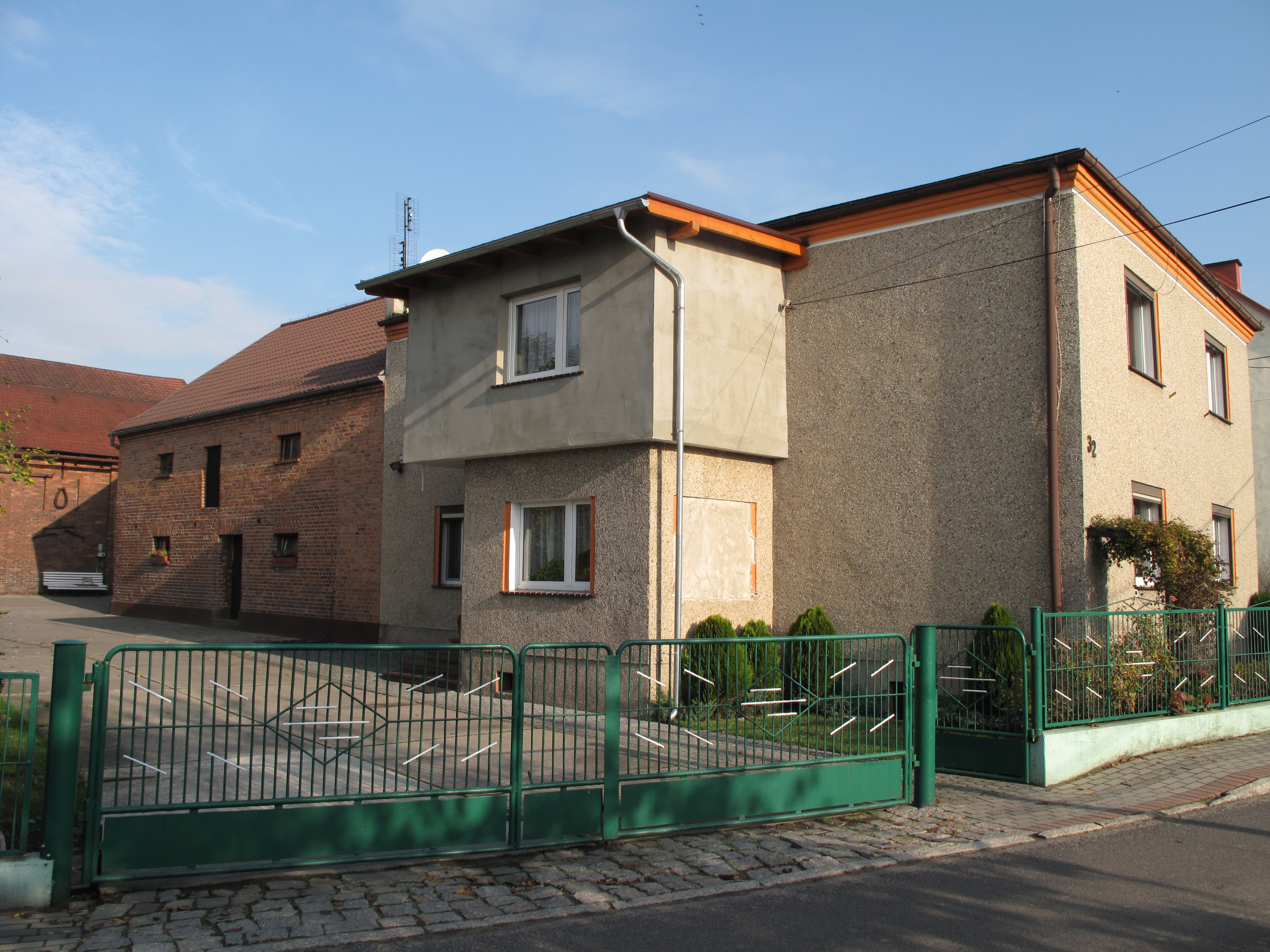
House

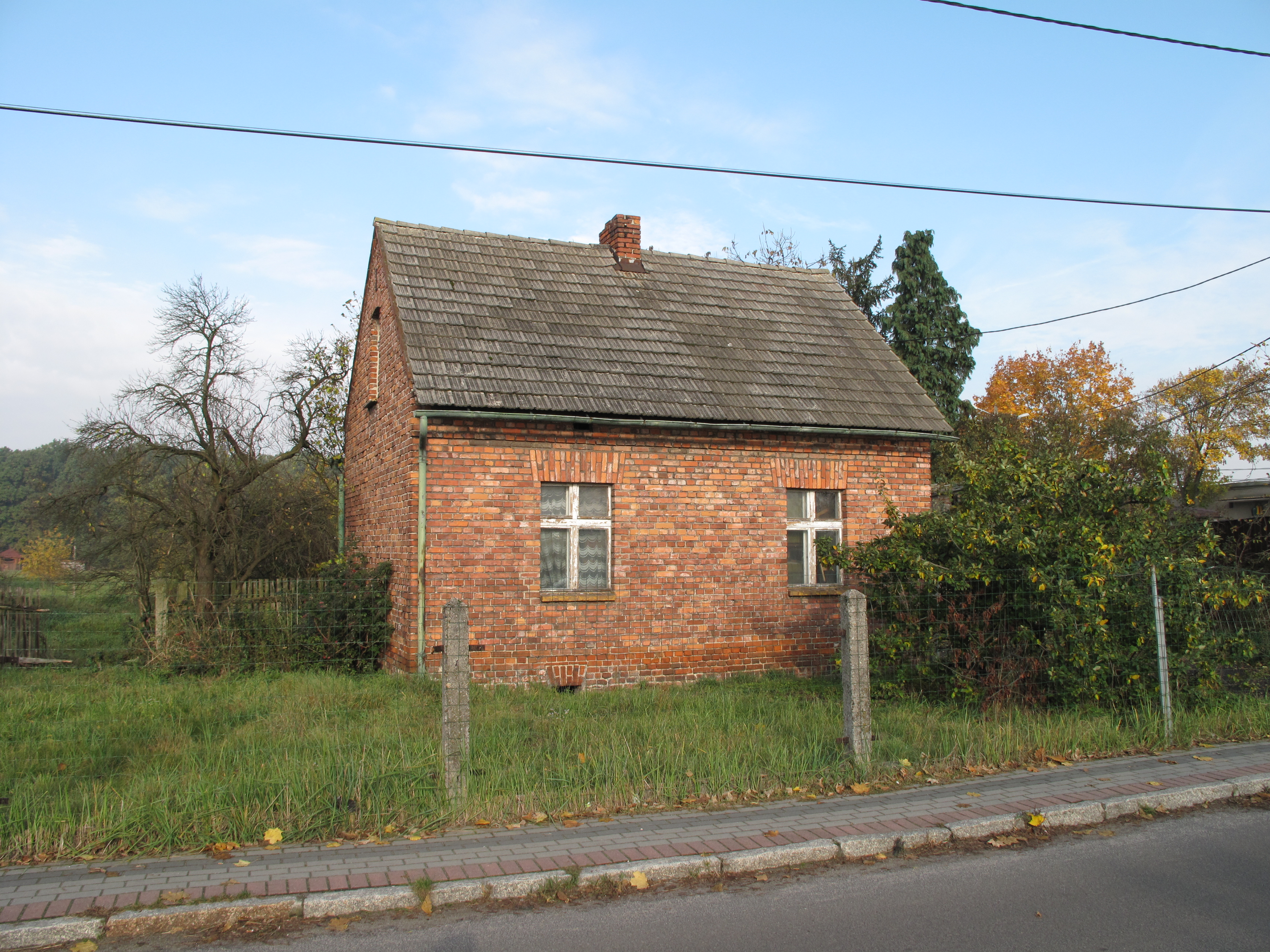
Brick house

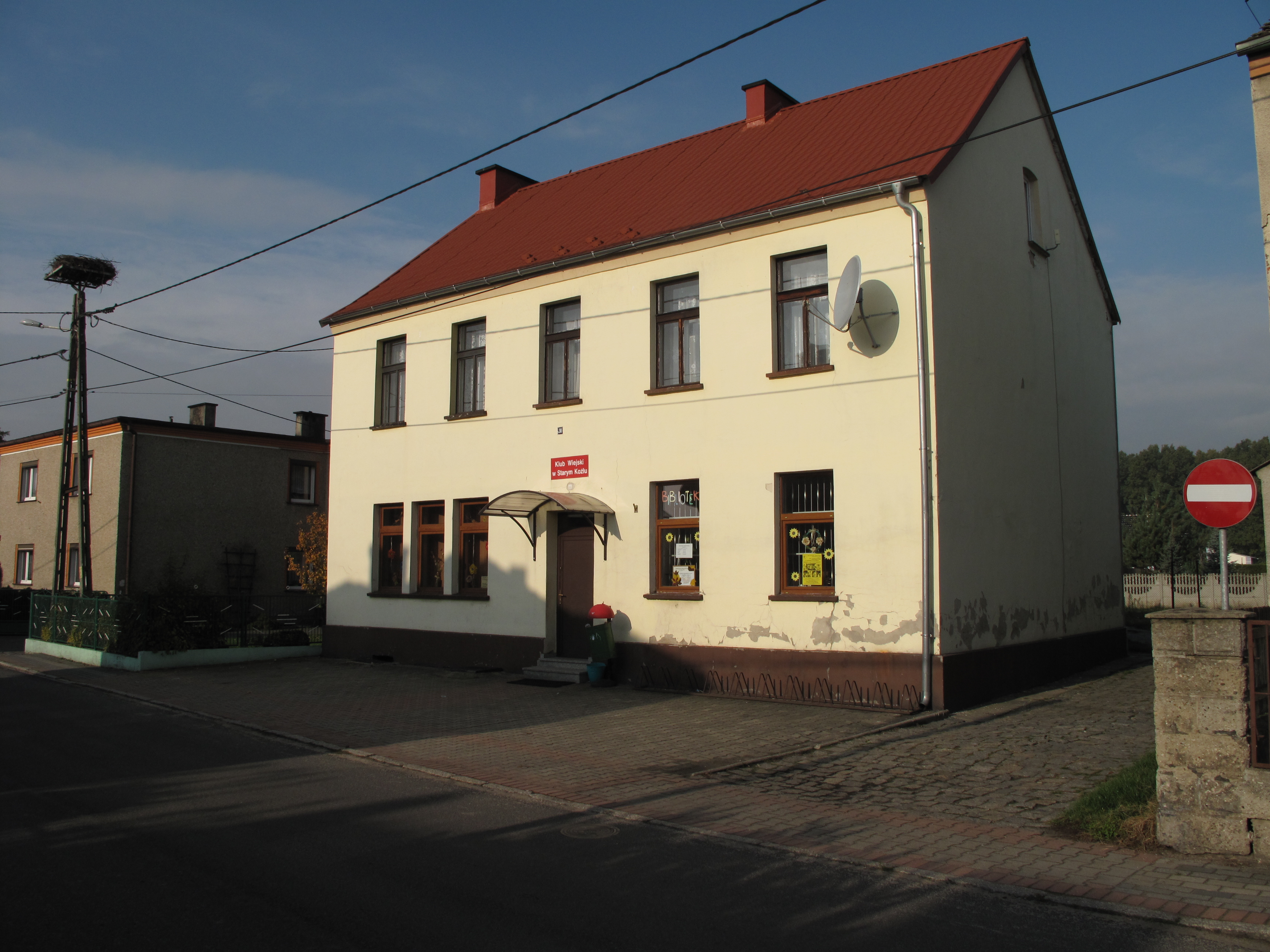
Village club
