= Korzonek, Opole Voivodeship =

Korzonek
- Village
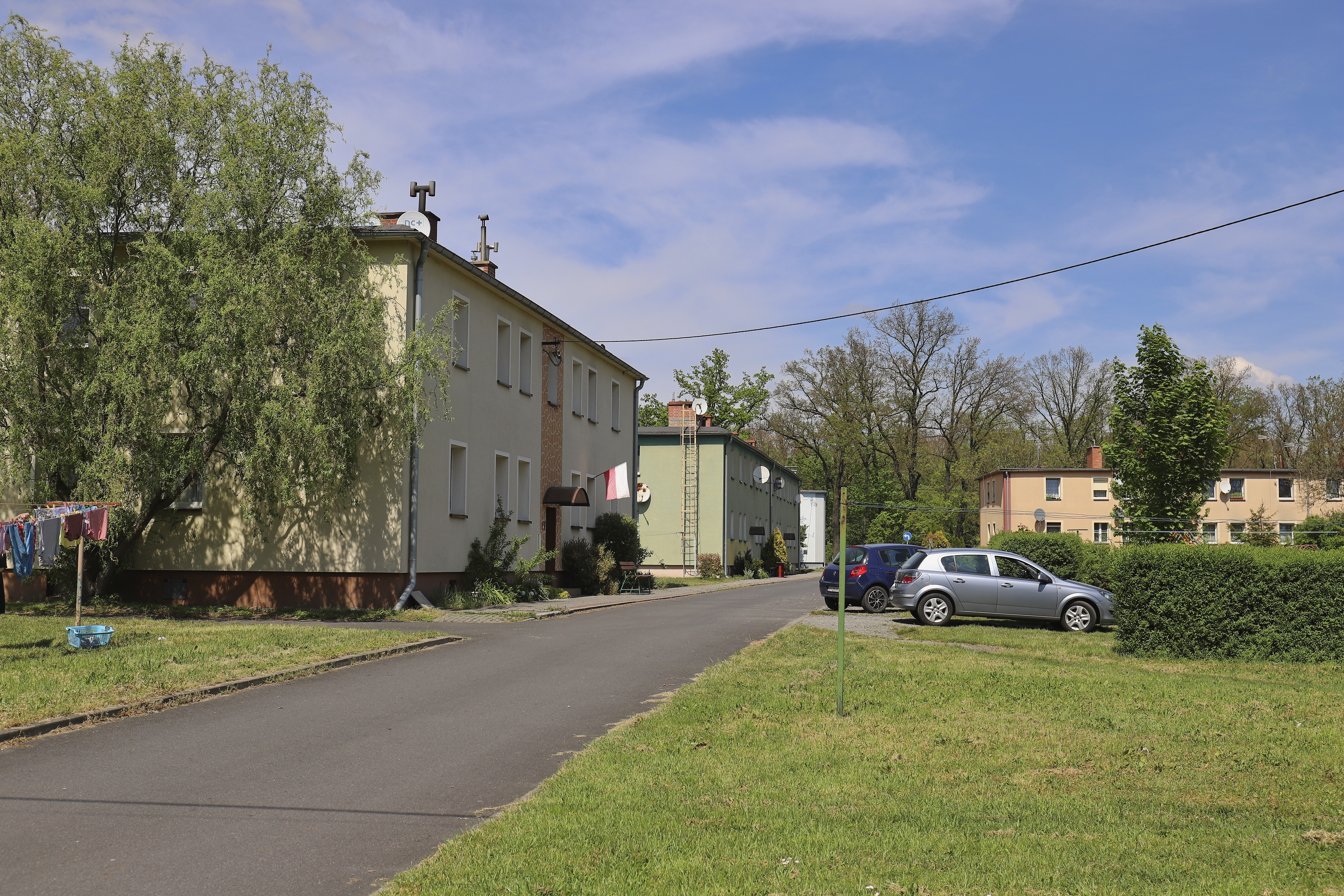

- Location within Poland
- Coordinates: 50°17′N 18°17′E
- Country: Poland
- Voivodeship: Opole
- County: Kędzierzyn-Koźle
- Gmina: Bierawa
- Population: 270
- Website: http://korzonek.org

Korzonek [kɔˈʐɔnɛk] is a village in the administrative district of Gmina Bierawa, within Kędzierzyn-Koźle County, Opole Voivodeship, in south-western Poland.
