= Schmölln-Putzkau =

- Municipality
- Location of Schmölln-Putzkau within Bautzen district
- Interactive map of Schmölln-Putzkau
- Location within Germany Location within Saxony
- Coordinates: 51°7′N 14°14′E
- Country: Germany
- State: Saxony
- District: Bautzen
- Subdivisions: 4

Government
  - Mayor (2022–29): Achim Wünsche

Area
  - Total: 32.94 km^{2} (12.72 sq mi)
- Elevation: 274 m (899 ft)

Population (2025-12-31)
  - Total: 2,964
  - Density: 89.98/km^{2} (233.1/sq mi)
- Time zone: UTC+01:00 (CET)
  - Summer (DST): UTC+02:00 (CEST)
- Postal codes: 01877
- Dialling codes: 03594
- Vehicle registration: BZ, BIW, HY, KM
- Website: schmoelln-putzkau.de

Schmölln-Putzkau (German name; Upper Sorbian name Smělna-Póckowy, pronounced [ˈsmʲɪlna ˈpʊtskɔwɨ]) is a municipality in the district of Bautzen, in Saxony, Germany.
