= Queen of Heaven =

Marian title

Our Lady Queen of Heaven
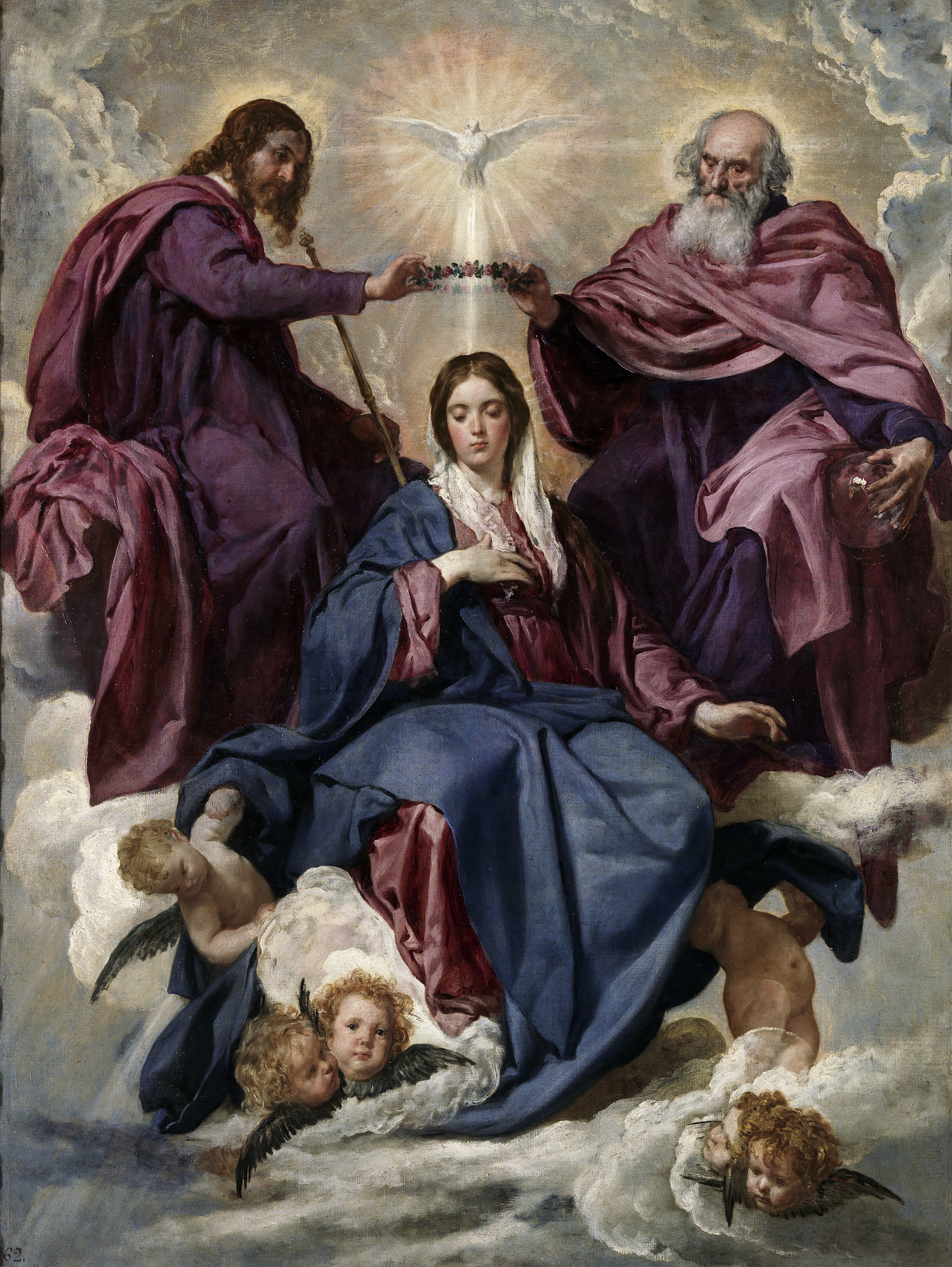
- Coronation of the Virgin, by Diego Velázquez

Queen of Heaven and Earth, Holy Queen
- Venerated in: Catholic Church, Evangelical Lutheranism, Anglican Communion, Eastern Orthodoxy
- Feast: 22 August (General Roman Calendar), 31 May (General Roman Calendar of 1960)
- Attributes: crowned by the Holy Trinity, crown of stars, flowers
- Patronage: Heaven, eternal salvation to humankind, redemption

Queen of Heaven (Latin: Regina Caeli) is a title given by the Catholic Church and Eastern Orthodoxy, to Mary, mother of Jesus, and, to a lesser extent, in Evangelical Lutheranism and Anglicanism. The title has long been a tradition, included in prayers and devotional literature and seen in Western art in the subject of the Coronation of the Virgin from the High Middle Ages, long before the Church gave it a formal definition status.

The Catholic teaching on this subject is expressed in the papal encyclical Ad Caeli Reginam, issued by Pope Pius XII in 1954. Therein, the pope states that Mary is called Queen of Heaven because her son, Jesus Christ, was charged as being "King of Israel" and the heavenly king of the universe. This would render the mother of the king as the "queen mother" of Israel.

== Theological basis ==
Queen of Heaven (Latin: Regina Caeli) is one of many queen titles used for Mary. The title derived in part from the ancient Catholic teaching that Mary, at the end of her earthly life, was bodily and spiritually assumed into heaven and that she is there honored as queen.

Pius XII explained the theological reasons for her title of Queen in a radio message to Fatima of May 13, 1946, Bendito seja (Portuguese for "Blessed be"):

He, the Son of God, reflects on His heavenly Mother the glory, the majesty and the dominion of His kingship, for, having been associated to the King of Martyrs in the ... work of human Redemption as Mother and cooperator, she remains forever associated to Him, with a practically unlimited power, in the distribution of the graces which flow from the Redemption. Jesus is King throughout all eternity by nature and by right of conquest: through Him, with Him, and subordinate to Him, Mary is Queen by grace, by divine relationship, by right of conquest, and by singular choice [of the Father].

In his 1954 encyclical Ad Caeli Reginam "To the Queen of Heaven", Pius XII asserts that Mary deserves the title because she is the Theotokos "mother of God", because she is closely associated as the New Eve with Jesus' redemptive work, because of her preeminent perfection and because of her intercessory power. Ad caeli reginam states that the main principle on which the royal dignity of Mary rests is her divine motherhood, and thus John of Damascus wrote, "When she became Mother of the Creator, she truly became Queen of every creature."

== Biblical basis ==
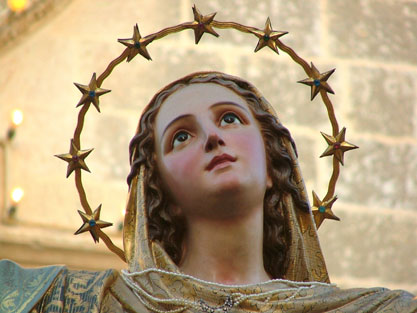
A statue of Mary crowned with 12 stars, a reference to Revelation 12. Statue by Attard, Malta

In the Hebrew Bible some Davidic kings had in their court a gebirah ("Great Lady") who was often their mother, and held great power as his advisor and an advocate to him. In 1 Kings 2:20, Solomon said to his mother Bathsheba, seated on a throne at his right, "Make your request, Mother, for I will not refuse you." The catholic theologian William G. Most sees here a sort of type of Mary.

In the New Testament, the title has several biblical sources. At the Annunciation, the archangel Gabriel announces that [Jesus] "... will be great, and will be called the Son of the Most High; and the Lord God will give to him the throne of his father David. He will rule over the house of Jacob forever and his reign will be without end."(Luke 1:32) The biblical precedent in ancient Israel is that the mother of the king becomes the queen mother. Mary's queenship is a share in Jesus’ kingship.

At the same time, the Bible also contains a strong condemnation of the worship of the so-called "queen of heaven" in the book of Jeremiah, where the prophet rebukes the people of Judah for making offerings and cakes to this figure (Jeremiah 7:18; 44:17–25). The passage portrays this practice as a form of idolatry that provoked the anger of God. Some critics of Marian devotion have pointed to this as a cautionary example of elevating a female figure to a divine status.

== Historical practice ==
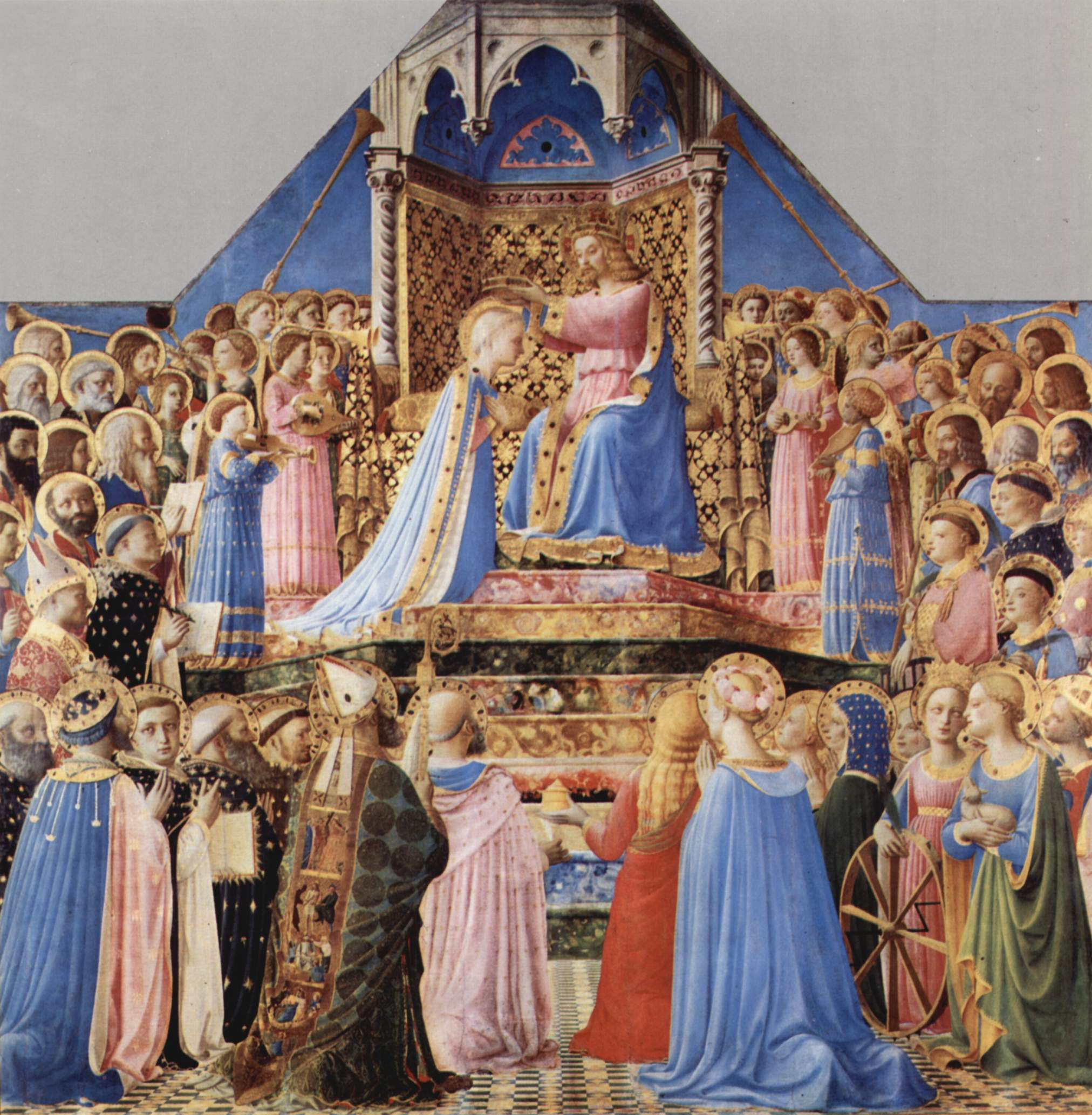
Fra Angelico, c. 1434–35

The Catholic Church from the earliest times venerated the Queen of Heaven, according to Pius XII:

From the earliest ages of the Catholic Church a Christian people, whether in time of triumph or more especially in time of crisis, has addressed prayers of petition and hymns of praise and veneration to the Queen of Heaven and never has that hope wavered which they placed in the Mother of the Divine King, Jesus Christ; nor has that faith ever failed by which we are taught that Mary, the Virgin Mother of God, reigns with a mother's solicitude over the entire world, just as she is crowned in heavenly blessedness with the glory of a Queen.

In the first three centuries of Christianity, Mary's queenship was popularized by the Transitus literature, that, according to Stephen Shoemaker, has its origins before the Council of Nicaea. Origen of Alexandria called Mary "my Lady", in his Hom VII in Lucam (PG 13:1902D), which is a royal title.

In the fourth century, Ephrem the Syrian called Mary "Lady" and "Queen". Later Church fathers and doctors continued to use the title. Similarly, Gregory of Nyssa in his Sermo de Annuntiatione (PG 62: 766) called her "Lady" (δέσποιναν). This title also appears in many other early writers, e.g., Jerome, and Peter Chrysologus. The first Mariological definition and basis for the title of Mary Queen of Heaven developed at the Council of Ephesus, where Mary was defined to be the Mother of God. The members of the Council specifically approved this version against the opinion, that Mary is "only" the mother of Jesus. Nobody, they ruled, had participated in the life of her son more than Mary, who gave birth to the Son of God.

The word "Queen" is common during and after the sixth century. Hymns of the 11th to 13th centuries address Mary as queen: "Hail, Holy Queen", "Hail, Queen of Heaven", "Queen of Heaven". The Dominican rosary and the Franciscan crown, as well as numerous invocations in Mary’s litany, celebrate her queenship. For centuries she has been invoked as the Queen of Heaven.

During the English Reformation, the title "Queen of Heaven", while eliminated from state-approved liturgy, became a symbol of resistance.

== Litany of Loreto ==
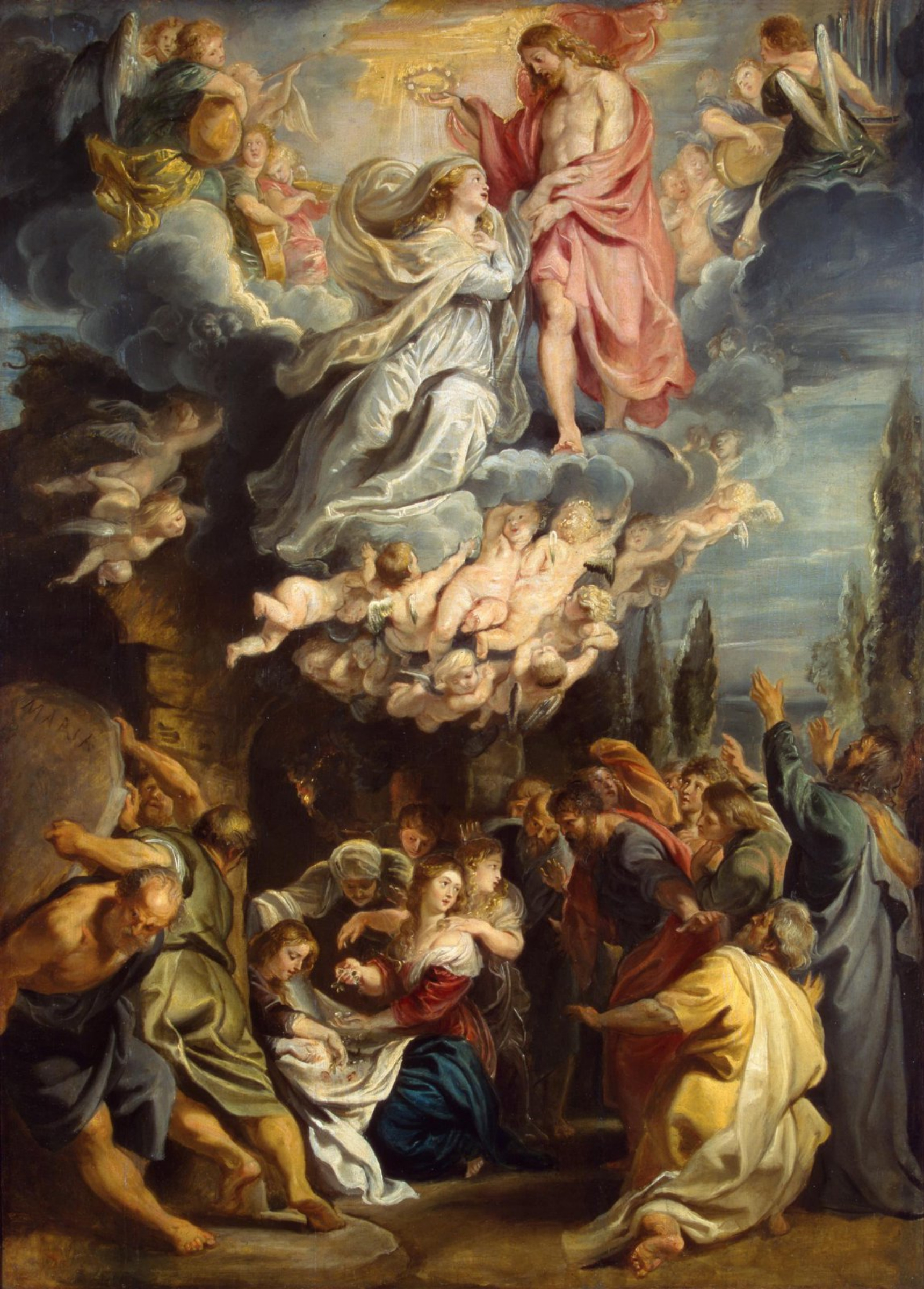
Rubens, 1609

She is invoked in the Litany of Loreto as:

- Queen of the Angels
- Queen of Patriarchs
- Queen of Prophets
- Queen of Apostles
- Queen of Martyrs
- Queen of Confessors
- Queen of Virgins
- Queen of all Saints
- Queen of Families
- Queen conceived without original sin
- Queen assumed into Heaven
- Queen of the Most Holy Rosary
- Queen of Peace

=== Other titles ===
The Second Vatican Council in 1964 referred to Mary as Queen of the Universe.

== Liturgy of the Hours ==
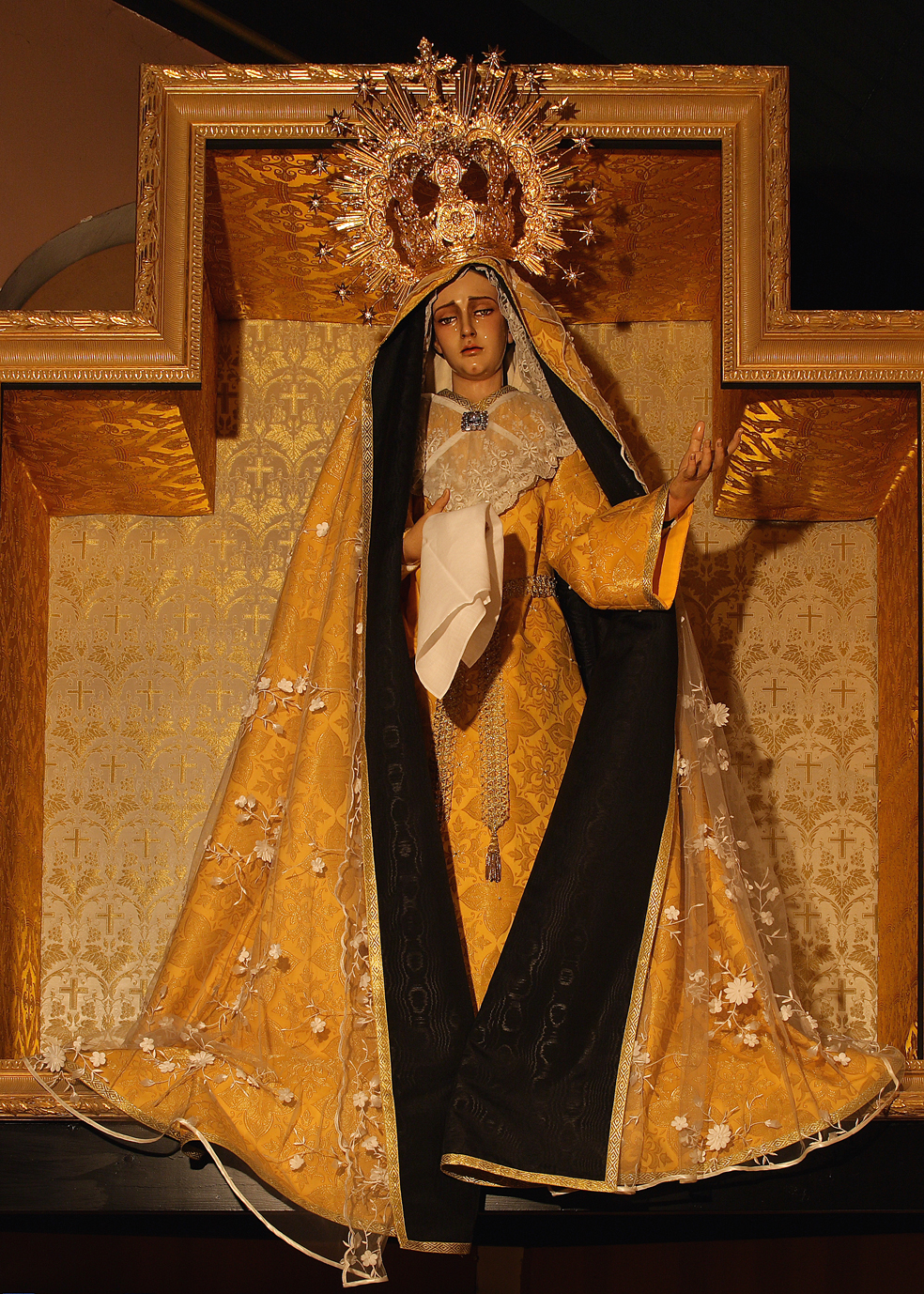
Crowned statue of Our Lady of Sorrows, Warfhuizen, the Netherlands

Three of the four ancient Marian antiphons of the Liturgy of the Hours (the Salve Regina, the Ave Regina caelorum, the Alma Redemptoris Mater, and the Regina Caeli), address Mary as queen. These are prayed at different times of the year, at the end of Compline.

=== Salve Regina ===
Mary as Queen of Heaven is praised in the Salve Regina ("Hail Queen"), which is considered the oldest of the four Marian antiphons and is sung in the time after Pentecost until the first Vespers of Advent. It is attributed to a German Benedictine monk, Hermann of Reichenau (1013–1054). Traditionally it has been sung in Latin, though many translations exist. In the Middle Ages, Salve Regina offices were held every Saturday. In the 13th century, the custom developed to greet the Queen of Heaven with the Salve Regina As a part of the Catholic Reformation, the Salve Regina was prayed every Saturday by members of the Sodality of Our Lady, a Jesuit Marian association. The Hail Holy Queen is also the final prayer of the Rosary.

=== Ave Regina caelorum ===
The Ave Regina caelorum ("Hail, Queen of the Heavens") is an early Marian antiphon, praising Mary, the Queen of Heaven. The antiphon is traditionally used after Vespers or Compline, from the Feast of the Presentation (2 February) through the Wednesday of Holy Week. It is also sung in the Liturgy of the Hours on the feast of the Assumption of Mary (or ad libitum on other Marian feasts with reference to the Queenship of Mary). The Ave Regina caelorum dates back in a different musical intonation to the 12th century. Today's version is slightly different from a 12th-century intonation. The Ave Regina caelorum has four parts: Ave, Salve, Gaude and Vale (in English: hail, rejoice, farewell). It was used for processions in honour of the Queen of Heaven. The Ave Regina caelorum received numerous musical versions, a famous one of which was composed in 1773 by Joseph Haydn.

=== Regina Caeli ===
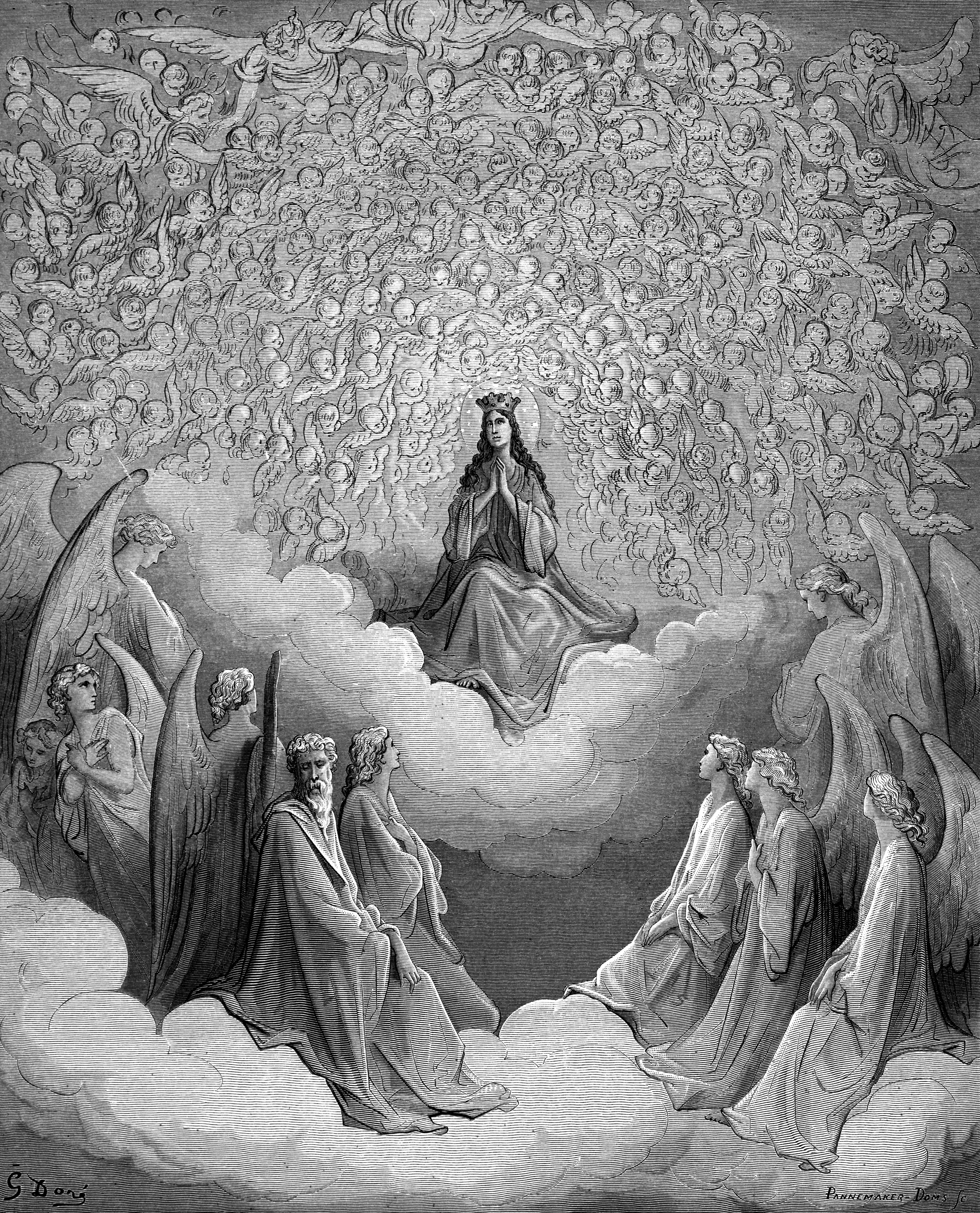
Mary as the Queen of Heaven in Dante's Divine Comedy. Illustration by Gustave Doré.

The Regina Caeli ("Queen of Heaven") is an anthem of the Catholic Church which replaces the Angelus during Eastertide, the fifty days from Easter Sunday to Pentecost. It is named for its opening words in Latin. Of unknown authorship, the anthem has been traced back to the twelfth century. It was in Franciscan use, after Compline, in the first half of the thirteenth century.

Different musical settings of the words were composed throughout the centuries by known and unknown composers. Not all attributions are correct, as an often quoted Regina Caeli by Joseph Haydn was not by him.

== Veneration ==
The small and simple young girl of Nazareth became Queen of the world! This is one of the marvels that reveal God’s Heart. Of course, Mary’s queenship is totally relative to Christ’s kingship. He is the Lord whom after the humiliation of death on the Cross the Father exalted above any other creature in Heaven and on earth and under the earth (cf. Phil 2: 9-11). Through a design of grace, the Immaculate Mother was fully associated with the mystery of the Son: in his Incarnation; in his earthly life, at first hidden at Nazareth and then manifested in the messianic ministry; in his Passion and death; and finally, in the glory of his Resurrection and Ascension into Heaven ... Benedict XVI.

The Queenship of Mary is commemorated in the last of the Glorious Mysteries of the Holy Rosary—the Coronation of the Virgin as Queen of Heaven and Earth.

Parishes and private groups often process and crown an image of Mary with flowers. This often is referred to as a "May Crowning". This rite may be done on solemnities and feasts of the Blessed Virgin Mary, or other festive days, and offers the Church a chance to reflect on Mary’s role in the history of salvation.

The Virgin has been called "Queen of France" since 1638 when, partly in thanksgiving for a victory over the Huguenots and also in hope of the birth of an heir after years of childless marriage, Louis XIII officially gave her that title. Siena, Tuscany, hails the Virgin as Queen of Siena, and annually observes the race and pageant called the "palio" in her honor.

Mary was declared "Queen of Poland" by king John II Casimir during the Lwów Oath in the 17th century. Since then she is believed to save the country miraculously during Deluge, Partitions of Poland, Polish-Soviet War, World War II and the Polish People's Republic. The solemnity of Our Lady Queen of Poland is celebrated on 3 May.

=== Feast of Queenship of Mary ===
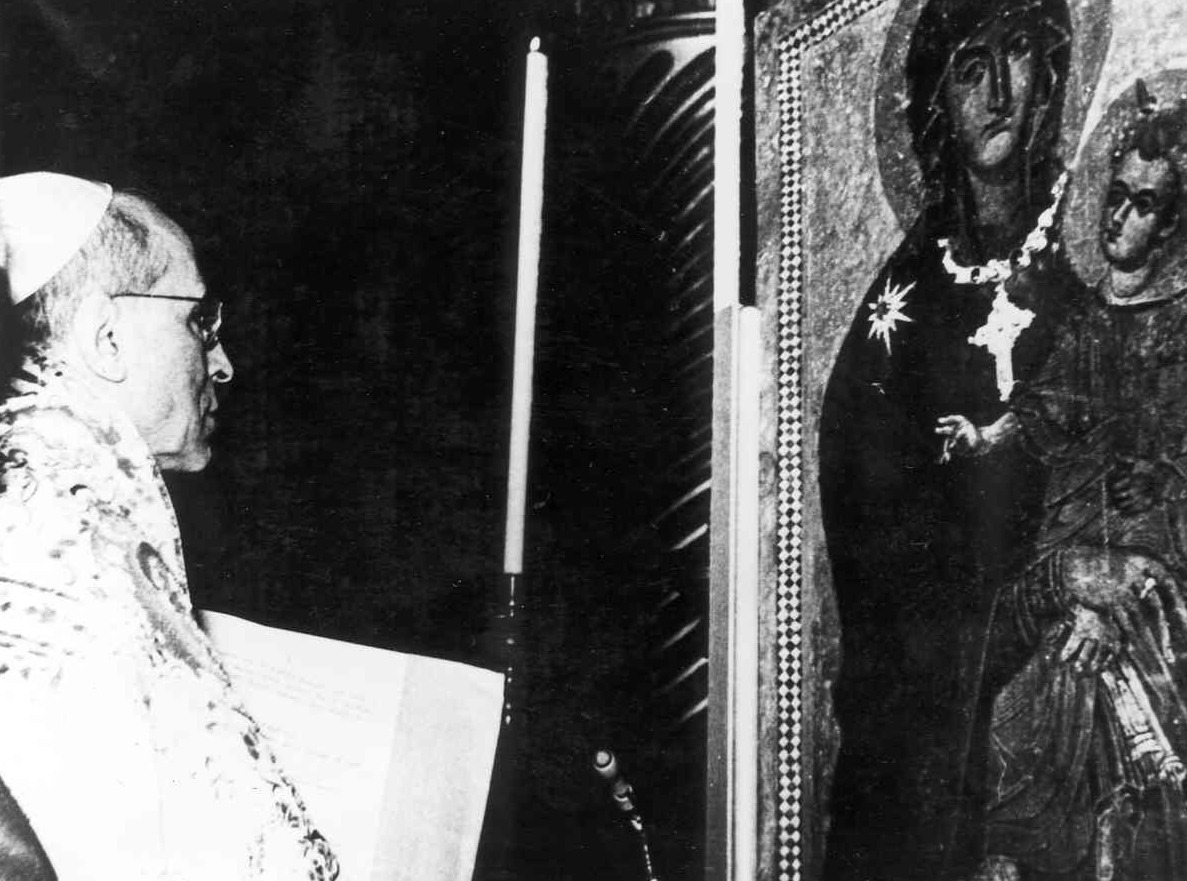
The coronation of the Salus Populi Romani icon by Pope Pius XII in 1954

Queenship of Mary is a Marian feast day in the liturgical calendar of the Catholic Church, created by Pope Pius XII. On 11 October 1954, the pontiff pronounced the new feast in his encyclical Ad caeli reginam. The feast was celebrated on May 31, the last day of the Marian month. The initial ceremony for this feast involved the crowning of the Salus Populi Romani icon of Mary in Rome by Pius XII as part of a procession in Rome.

In 1969, Pope Paul VI moved the feast day to August 22, the former Octave day of the Assumption in order to emphasize the close bond between Mary's queenship and her glorification in body and soul next to her Son. The Second Vatican Council's Constitution on the Church states that "Mary was taken up body and soul into heavenly glory, and exalted by the Lord as Queen of the universe, that she might be the more fully conformed to her Son" (Lumen gentium, 59).

The movement to officially recognise the Queenship of Mary was initially promoted by several Catholic Mariological congresses in Lyon, France; Freiburg, Germany; and Einsiedeln, Switzerland. Gabriel Roschini founded in Rome, Italy, an international society to promote the Queenship of Mary, Pro Regalitate Mariae. Several popes had described Mary as Queen and Queen of Heaven, which was documented by Roschini. Pope Pius XII repeated the title in numerous encyclicals and apostolic letters, especially during World War II.

=== Marian processions ===
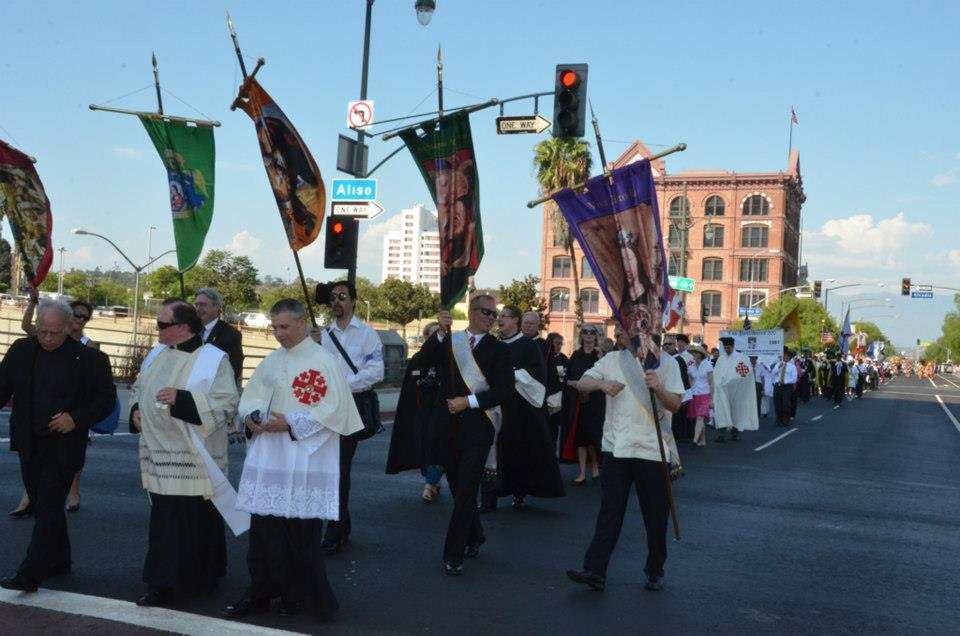
Annual Grand Marian Procession through Downtown Los Angeles

In Los Angeles, California, a Marian procession took place annually for roughly the first 100 years following the founding of the city. In an attempt to revive the custom of religious processions, in September 2011 the Queen of Angels Foundation, founded by Mark Anchor Albert, inaugurated an annual "Grand Marian Procession" in the heart of Downtown Los Angeles' historic core. This yearly procession, intended to coincide with the anniversary of the founding of the City of Los Angeles, begins outside of the parish of La Iglesia de Nuestra Señora Reina de los Angeles which is part of the Los Angeles Plaza Historic District, better known as "La Placita". By way of city streets, the procession eventually terminates at the Cathedral of Our Lady of the Angels where a public Rosary and Mass in honour of the Blessed Virgin Mary are offered. Subsequent years have seen the involvement and participation of numerous chivalric, fraternal, and religious orders, parishes, lay groups, political figures, as well as other religious and civic organizations.

== Christian art ==
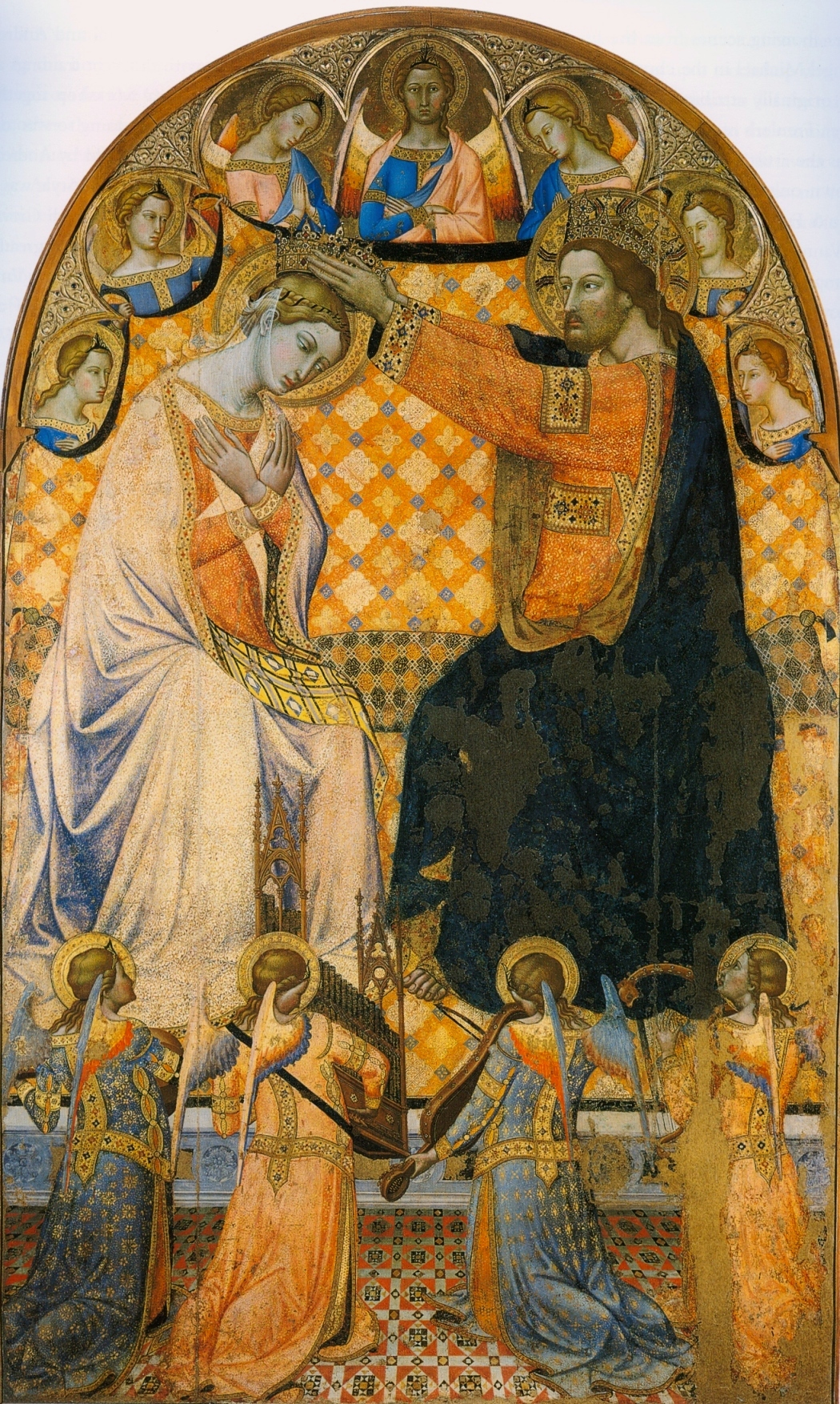
Giacomo di Mino, 1340–1350

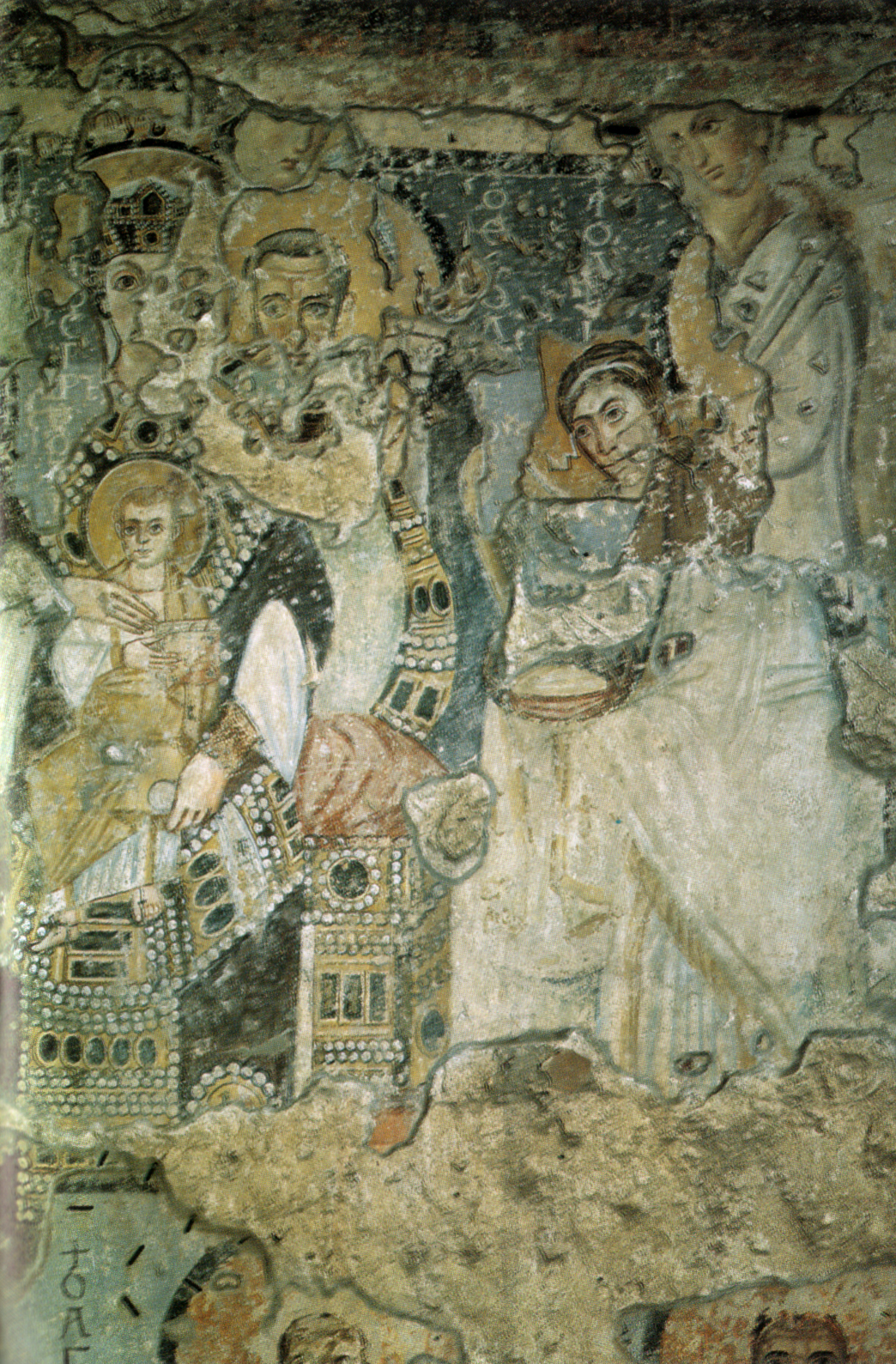
Earliest known (6th century) Roman depiction of Santa Maria Regina (Saint Mary the Queen). Santa Maria Antiqua church, Rome.

Early Christian art shows Mary in an elevated position. She carries her divine son in her hands, or holds him. The earliest known Roman depiction of Santa Maria Regina depicting Mary as a queen dates to the 6th century and is found in the modest church of Santa Maria Antiqua built in the 5th century in the Forum Romanum. Here Mary is unequivocally depicted as an empress. As one of the earliest Catholic Marian churches, this church was used by Pope John VII in the early 8th century as the see of the bishop of Rome. Also in the 8th century, the Second Council of Nicaea decreed that such pictures of Mary should be venerated.

Evangelical Lutheranism holds Mary in high esteem churches and Lutheran art has been made in her honour. The façade of Saint Mary's Church in Berlin is "crowned by a wooden sculpture of the Virgin with child, standing on a half moon, with crown and sceptre, thus depicting Mary as Regina Coeli, as Queen of Heaven."

In contrast, in the early 16th century, Reformed leaders began to discourage Marian art, and some like Calvin or Zwingli even encouraged its destruction. But after the Council of Trent in the mid-16th century confirmed the veneration of Marian paintings for Catholics, Mary was often painted as a Madonna with crown, surrounded by stars, standing on top of the world or the partly visible moon. These depictions occur in Evangelical Lutheranism as well, as with Saint Mary's Church in Berlin. After the victory against the Turks at Lepanto, Mary is depicted as the Queen of Victory, sometimes wearing the crown of the Habsburg empire. National interpretations existed in France as well, where Jean Fouquet painted the Queen of Heaven in 1450 with the face of the mistress of King Charles VII. Statues and pictures of Mary were crowned by kings in Poland, France, Bavaria, Hungary and Austria, sometimes apparently using crowns previously worn by earthly monarchs. A surviving small crown presented by Margaret of York seems to have been that worn by her at her wedding to Charles the Bold in 1463. A recent coronation was that of the picture of the Salus Populi Romani in 1954 by Pius XII. The veneration of Mary as queen continues into the 21st century, but artistic expressions do not have the leading role as in previous times.

Artworks, including paintings, mosaics and carvings of the coronation of Mary as Queen of Heaven, became increasingly popular from the 13th century onward. Works follow a set pattern, showing Mary kneeling in the heavenly court, and being crowned either by Jesus alone, or else by Jesus and God the Father together, with the Holy Spirit, usually in the form of a dove, completing the Trinity. The Coronation of Mary is almost entirely a theme of Western Christian art. In the Eastern Orthodox Church, although Mary is often shown wearing a crown, the coronation itself never became an accepted artistic subject.

== Gallery of art ==
=== Paintings ===
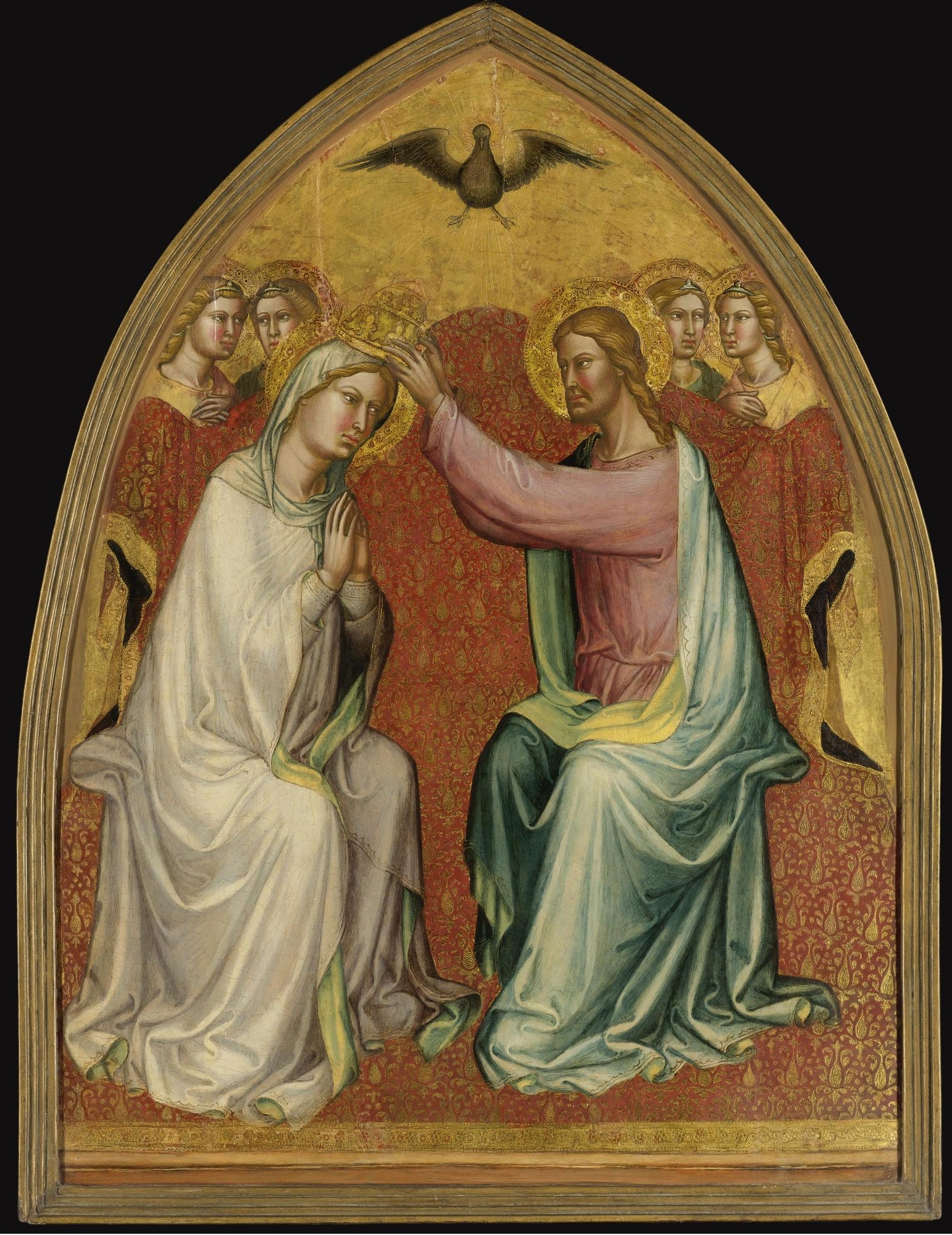
Martino di Bartolomeo, 1400

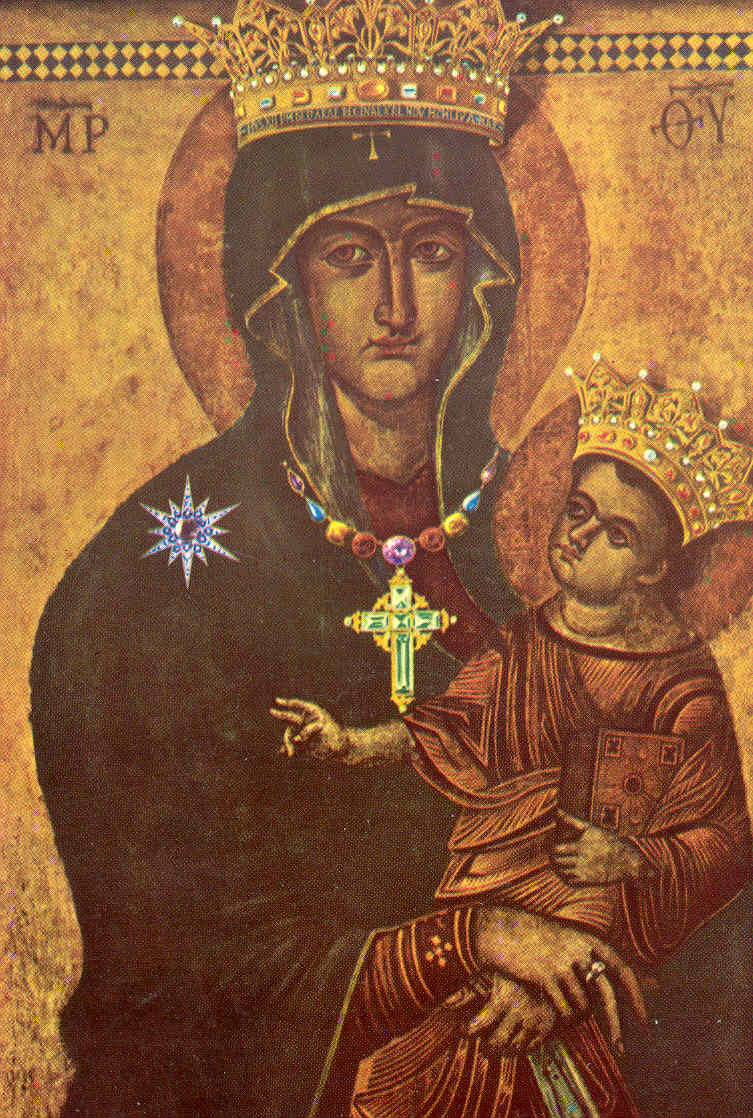
The icon Salus Populi Romani, crowned for the Marian year 1954

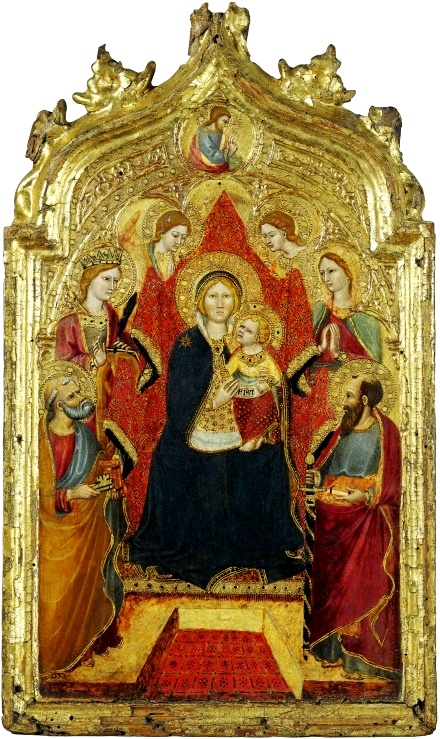
Gregorio di Cecco Enthroned Madonna

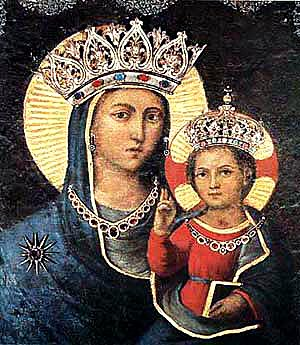
Crowned Madonna Della Strada

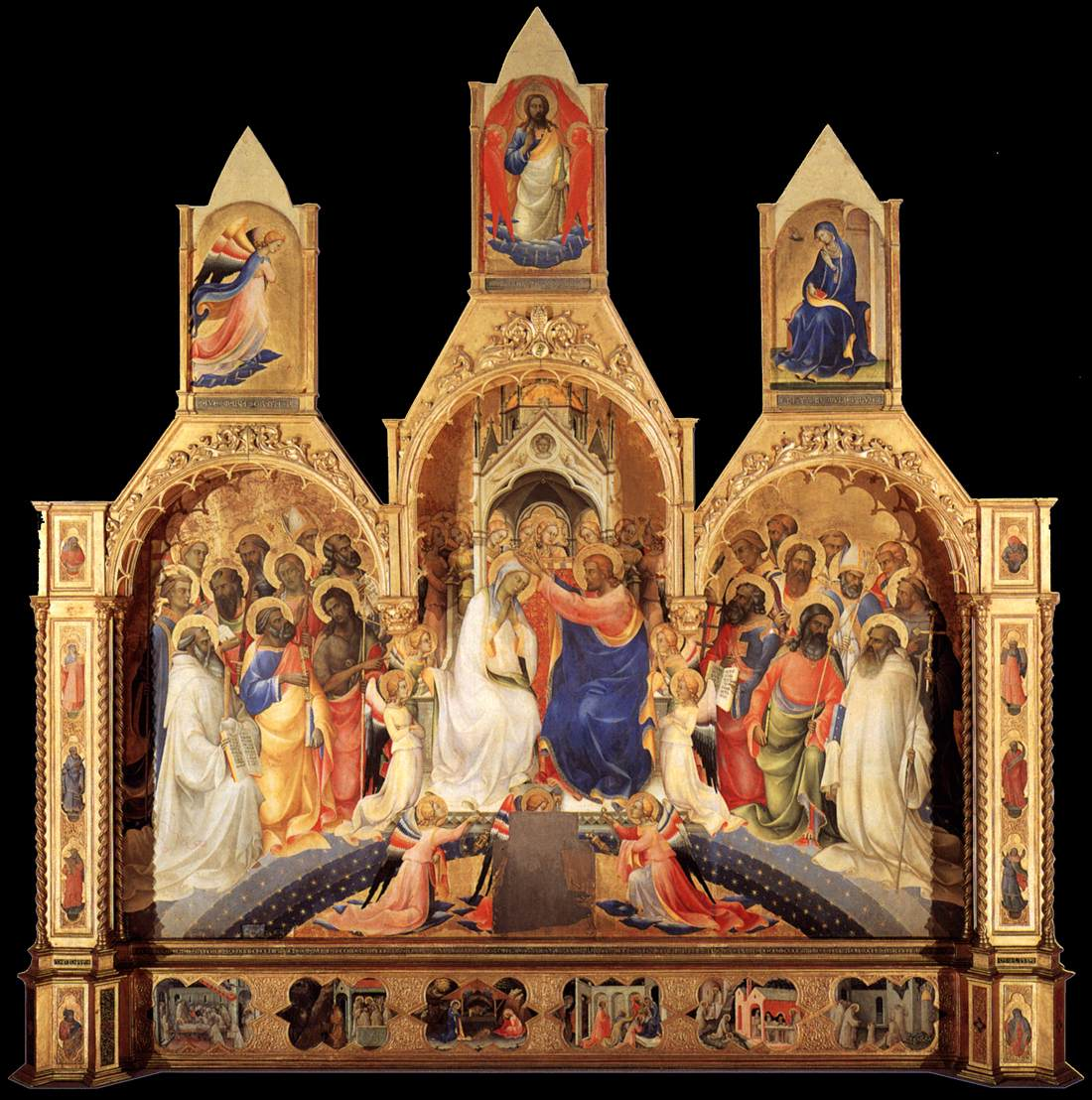
Lorenzo Monaco, Coronation, 1414, Uffizi, Florence

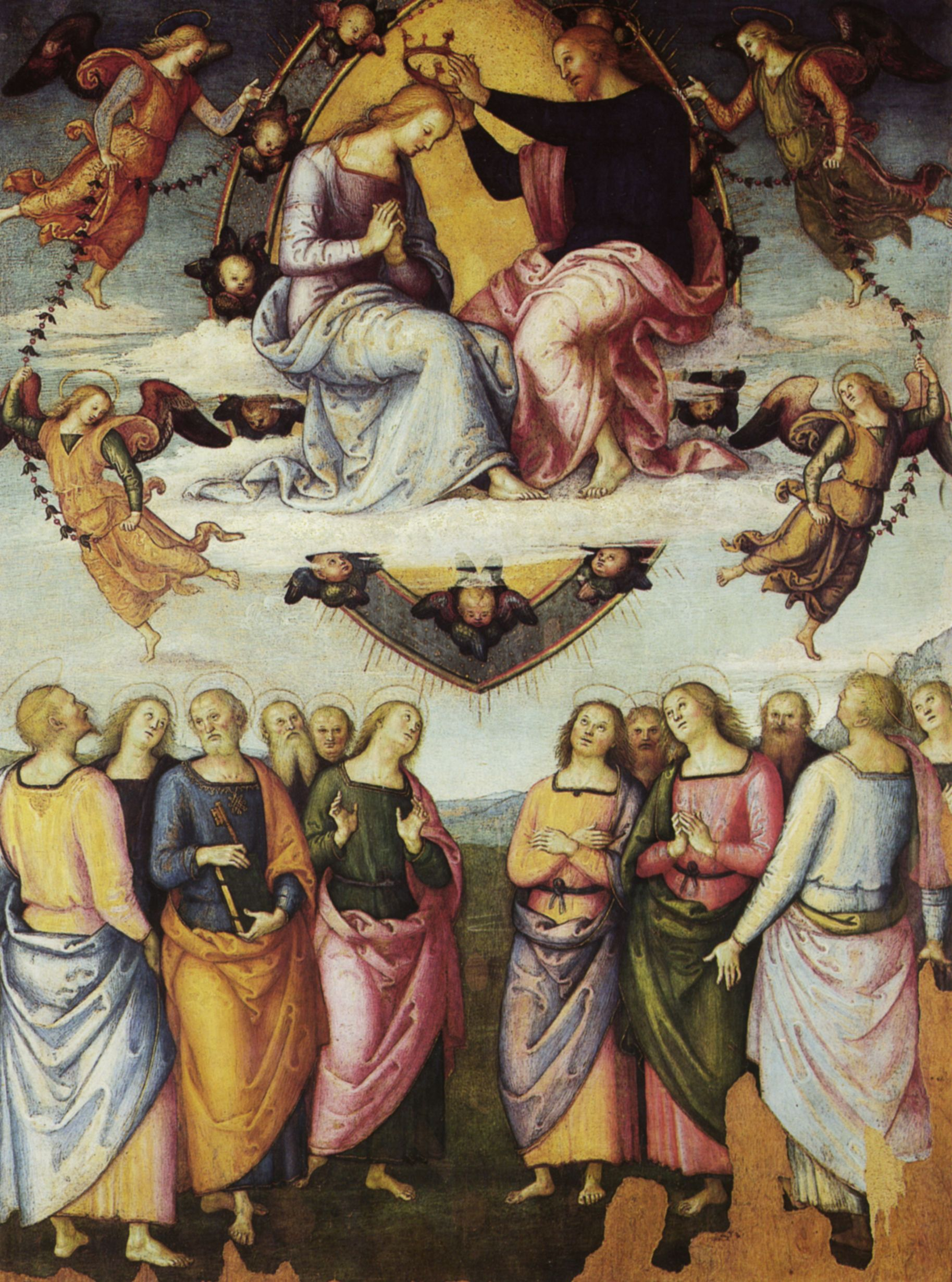
Pietro Perugino, 1504

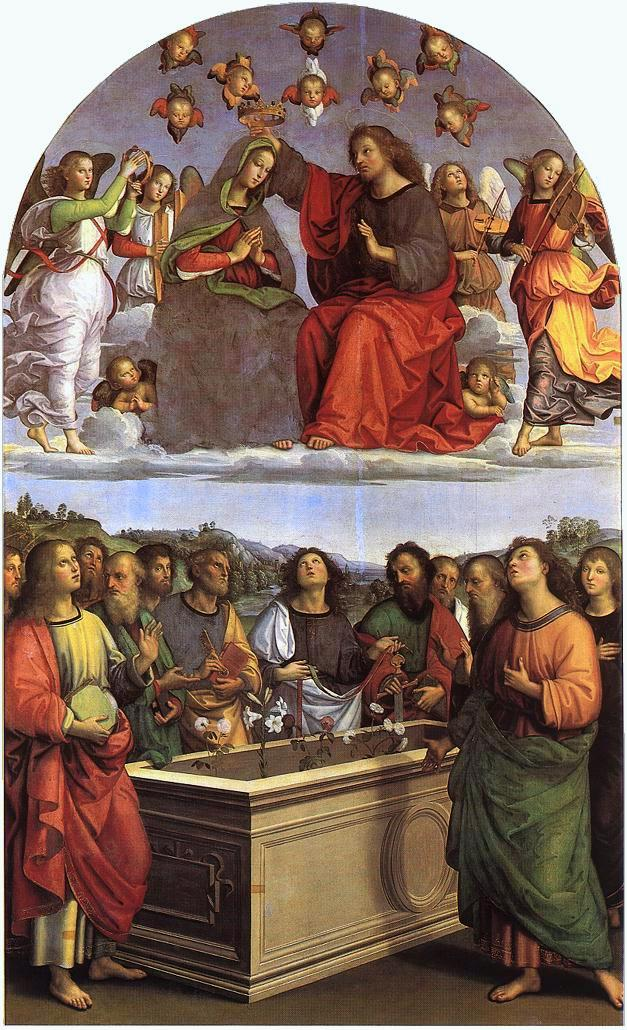
Raphael, 1502–1504

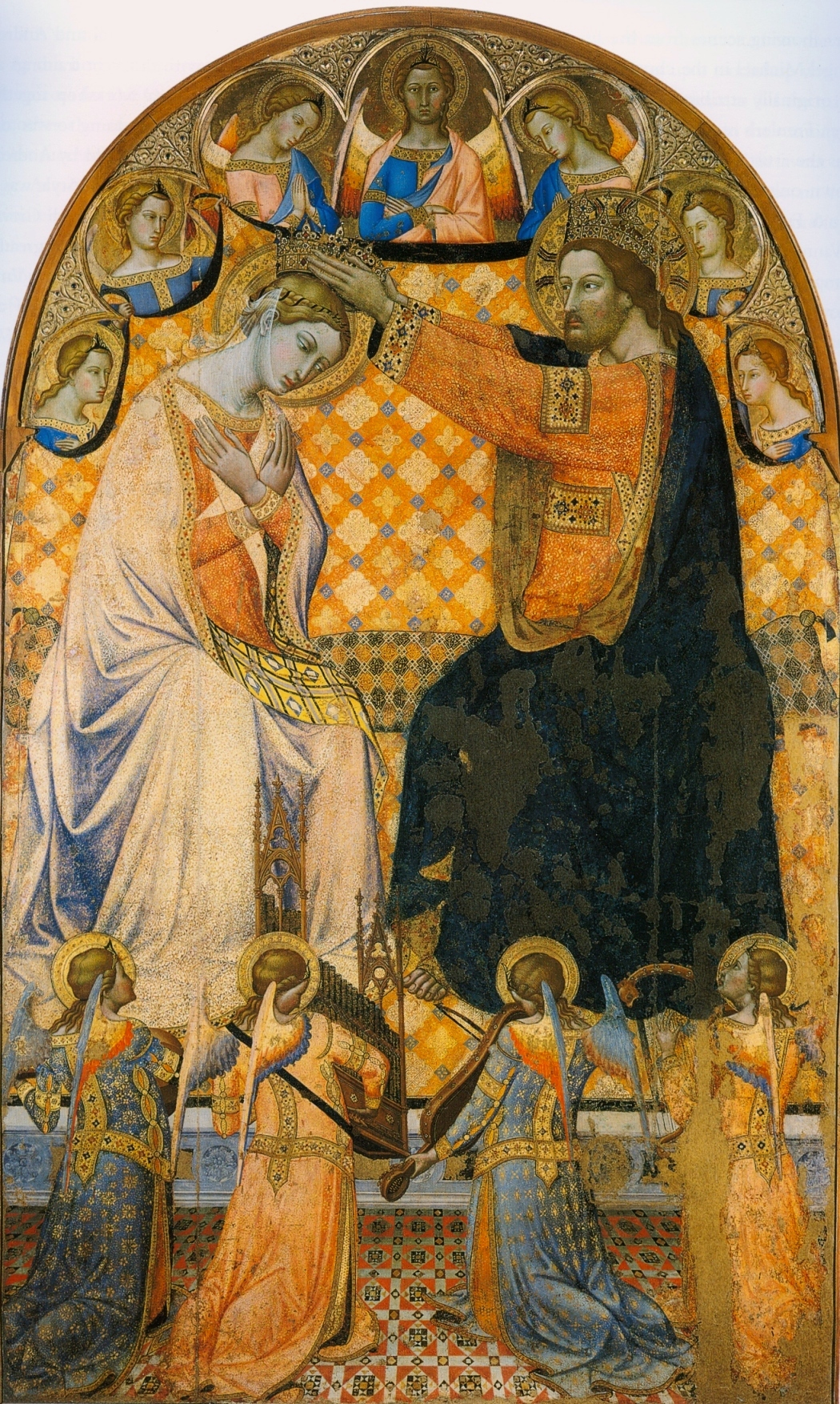
Giacomo di Mino, 1340–1350

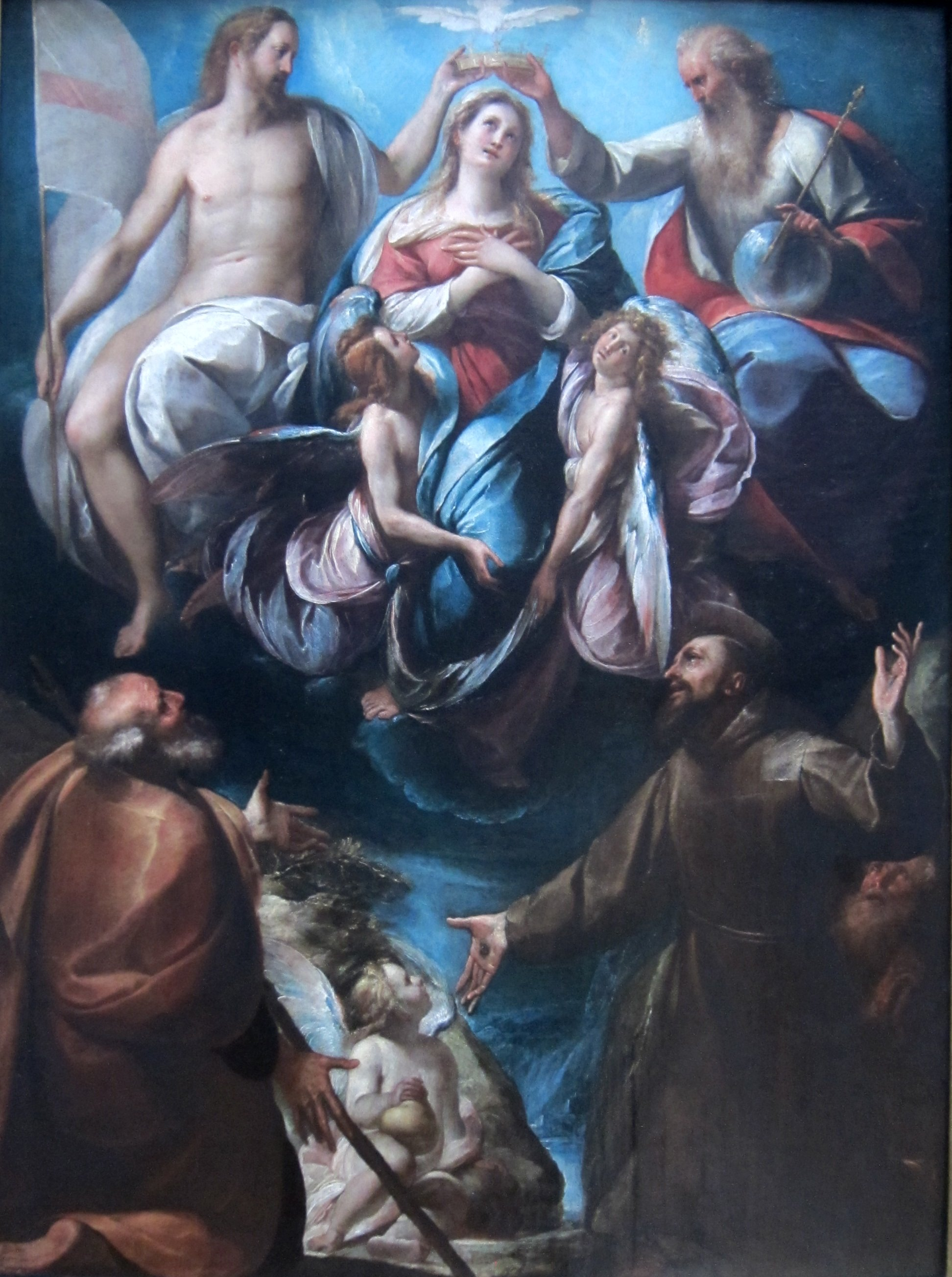
Giulio Cesare Procaccini, 17th century

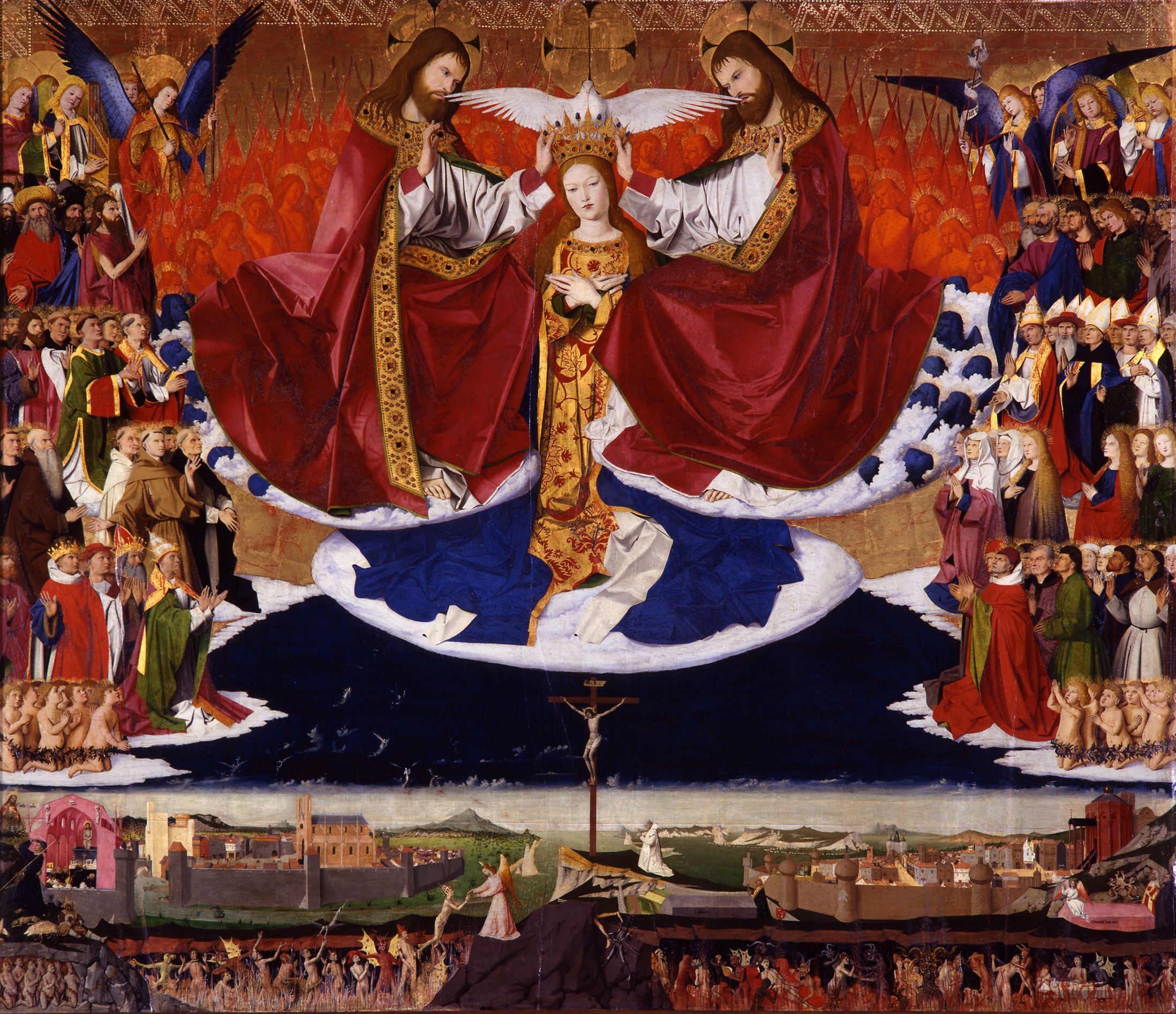
Enguerrand Charonton Coronation of Mary by the Trinity, 1454

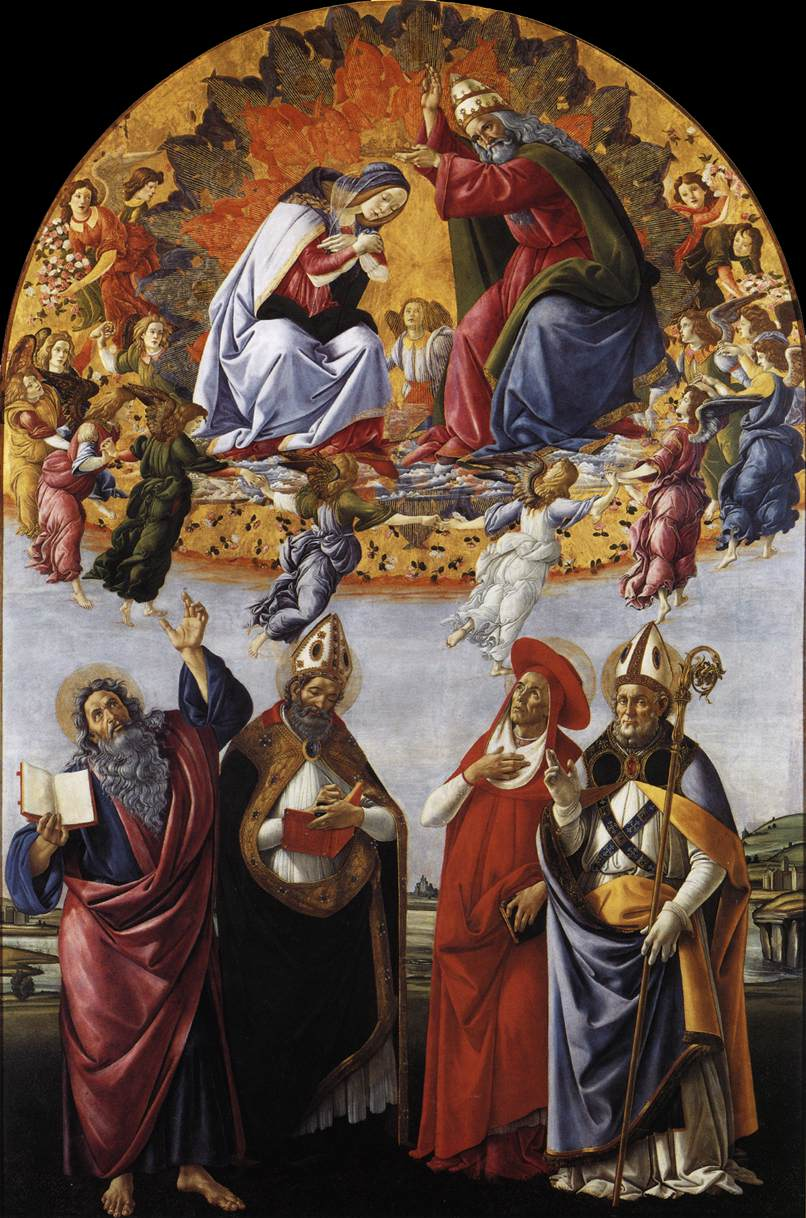
Botticelli, with only God the Father, 15th century

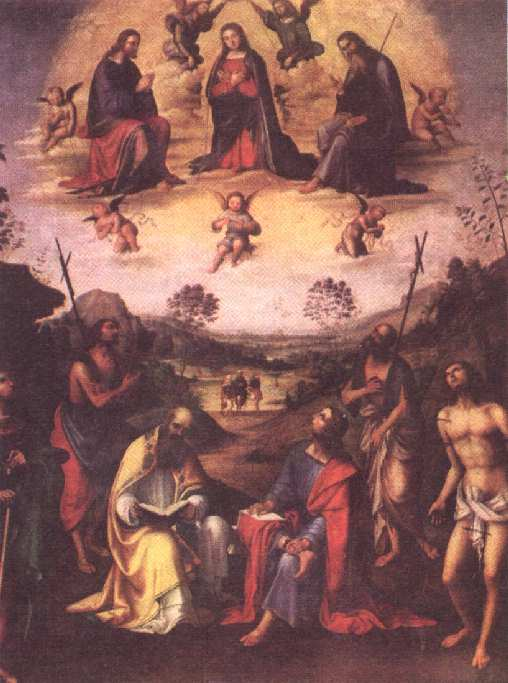
Lorenzo Costa, Crowning of the Madonna and saints, 1501

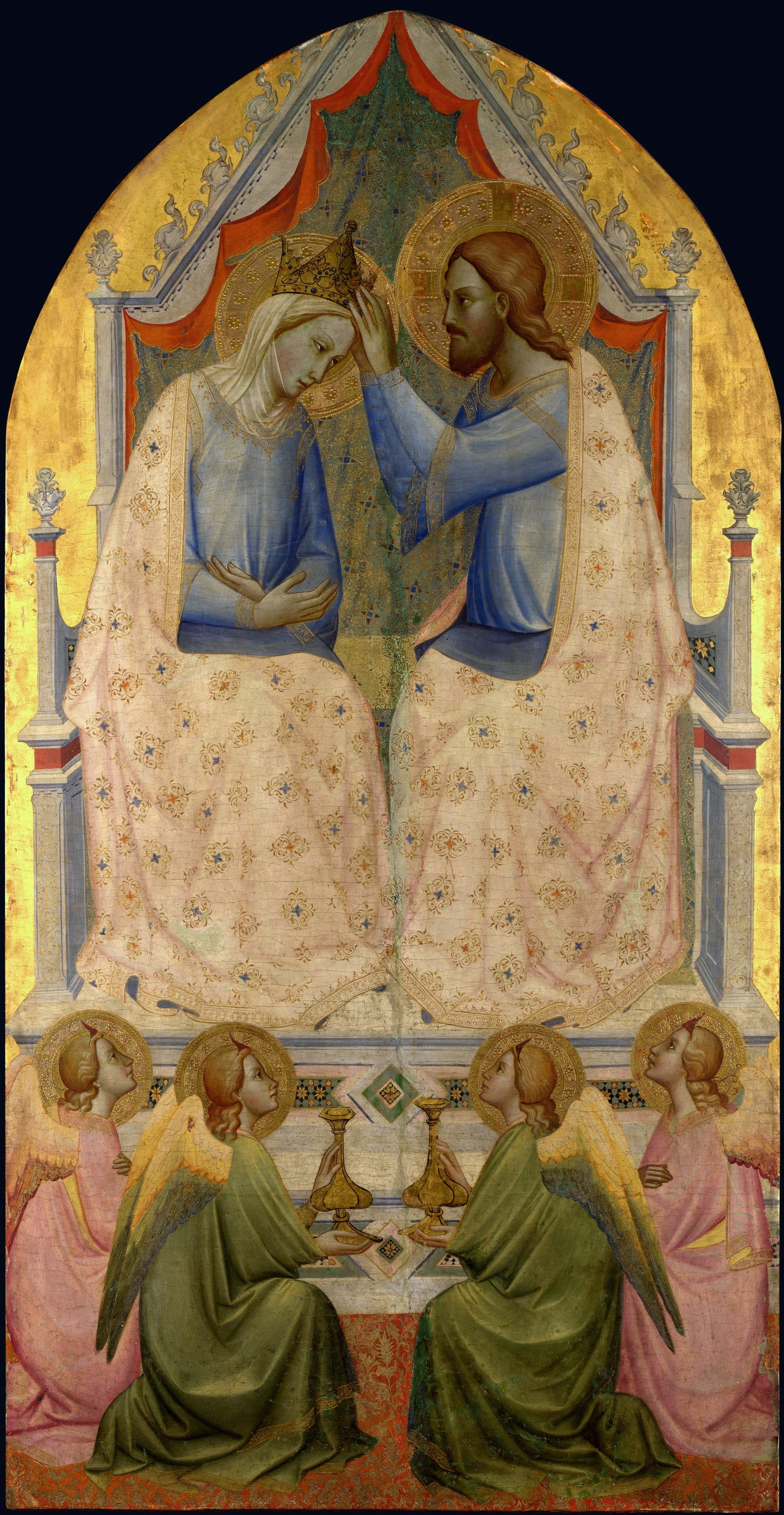
Coronation, Agnolo Gaddi, 14th century

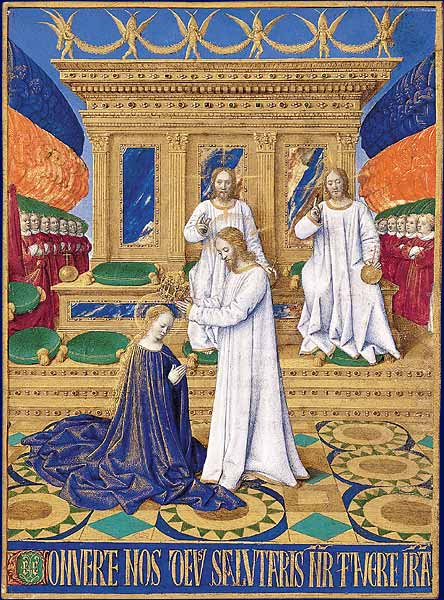
Jean Fouquet, Coronation of the Virgin, 15th century

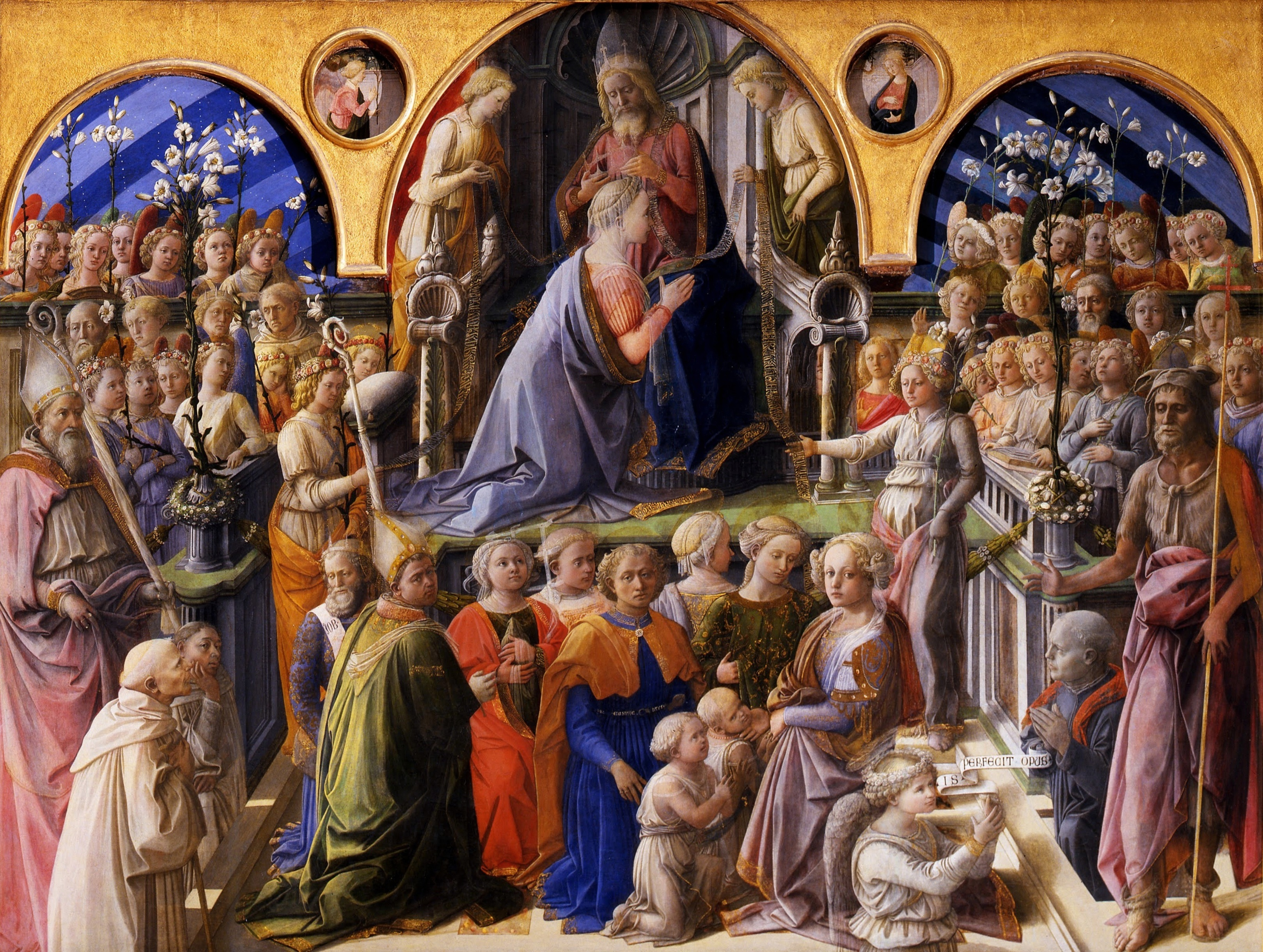
Coronation of the Virgin by Filippo Lippi, 1441

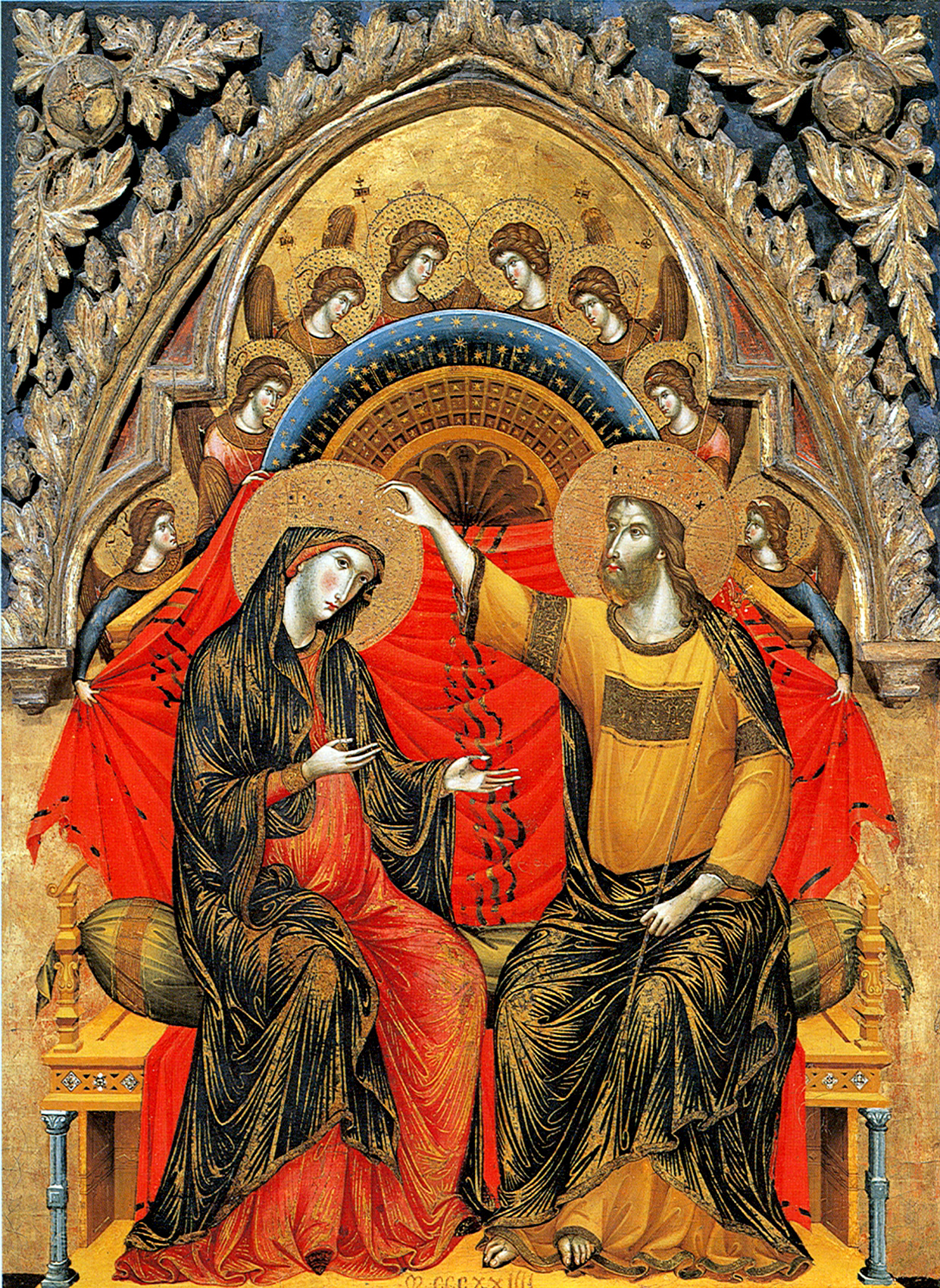
Paolo Veneziano, 1324

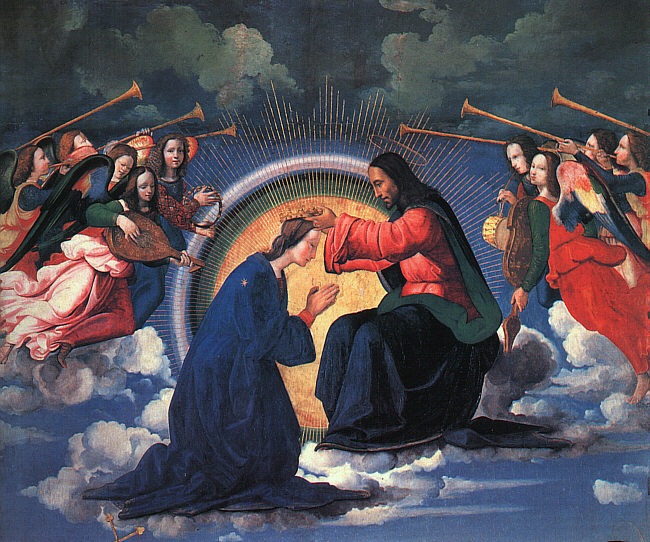
Ridolfo Ghirlandaio, 1504

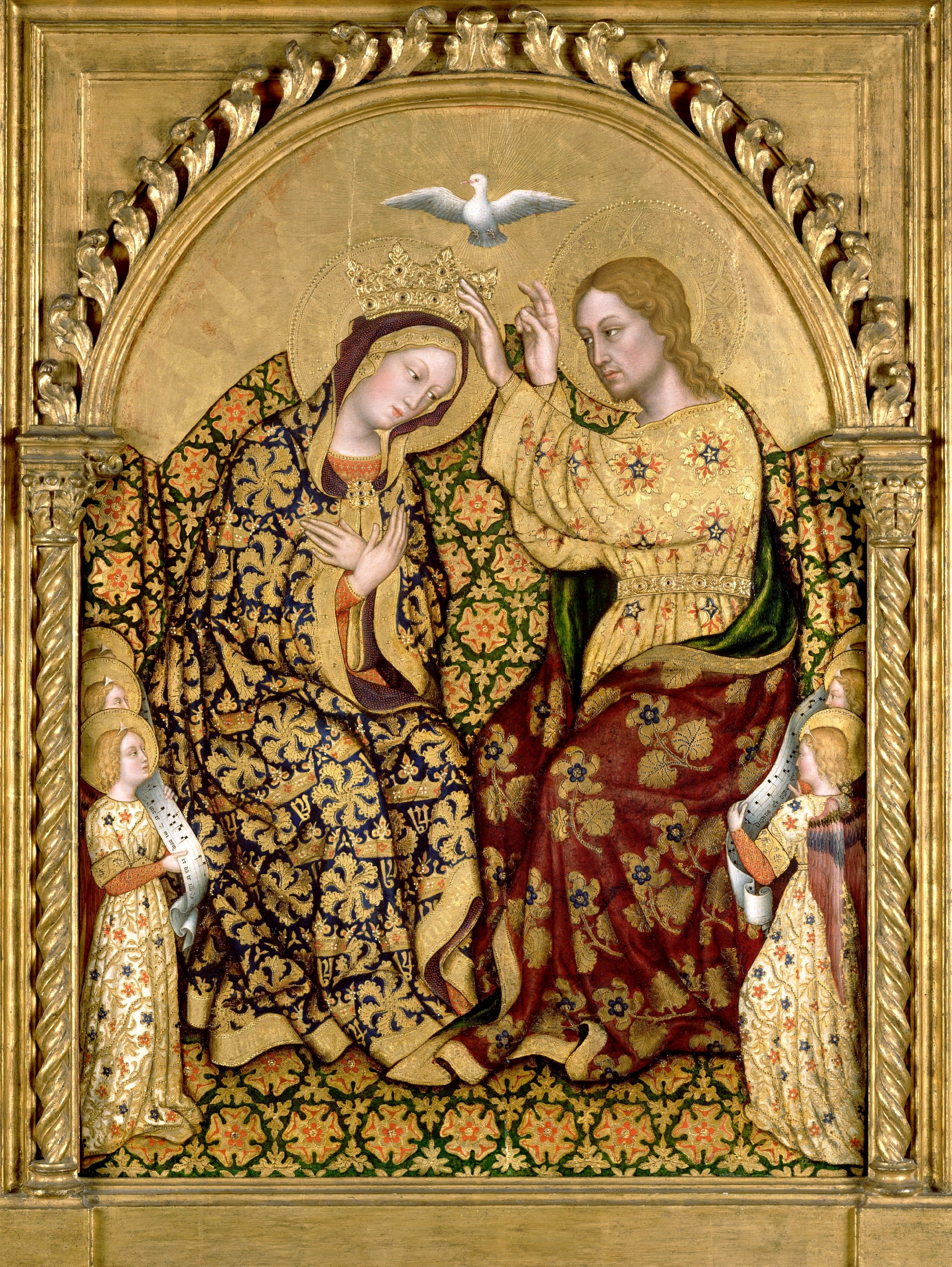
Gentile da Fabriano, 1422–1425

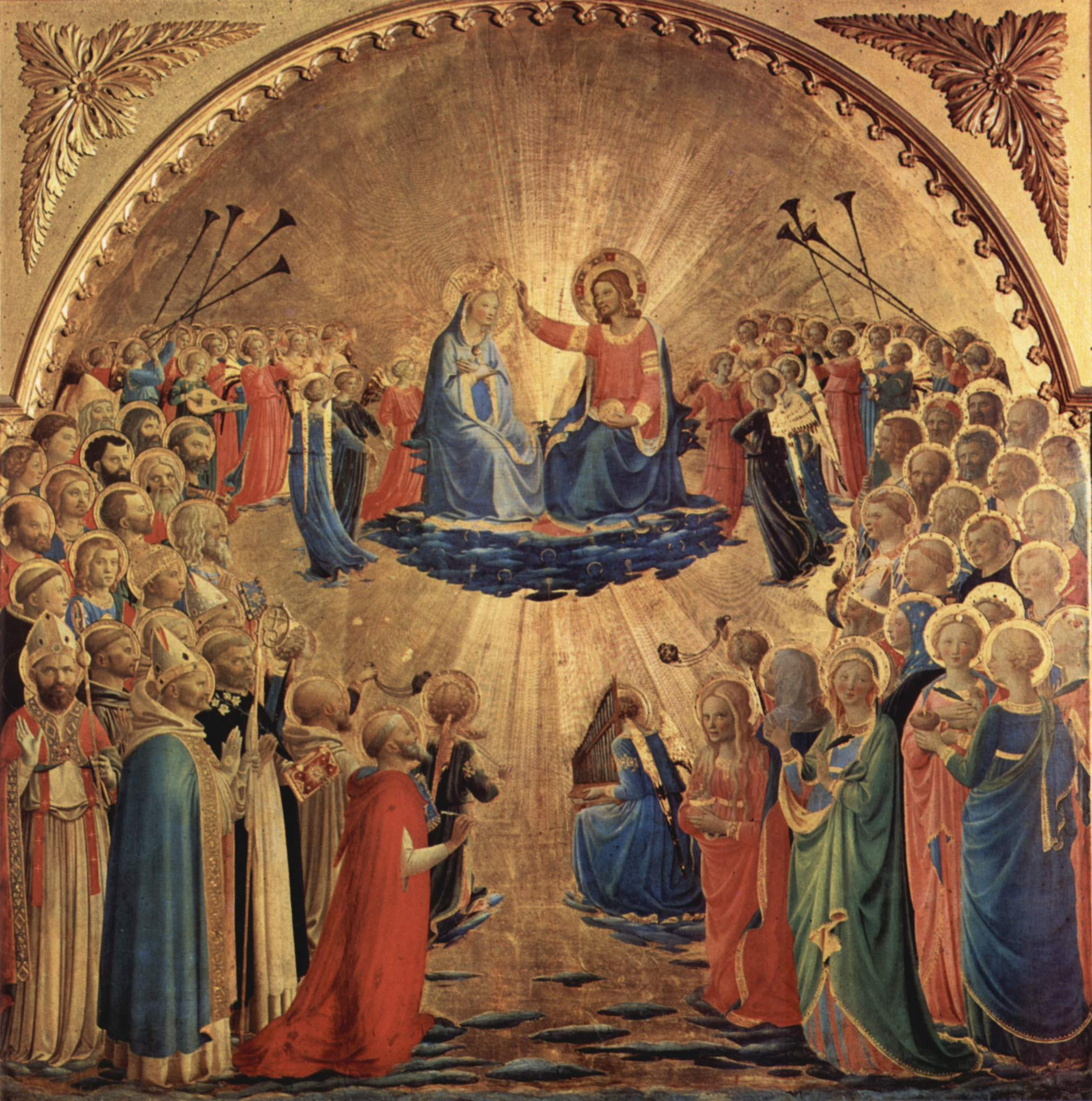
Fra Angelico, 1434–1435

=== Statues ===
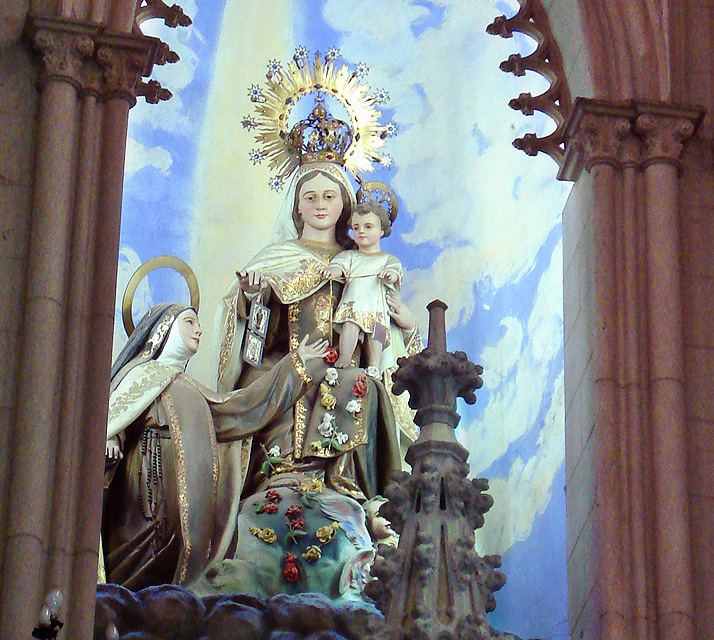
Crowned statue in Porto Alegre, Brazil

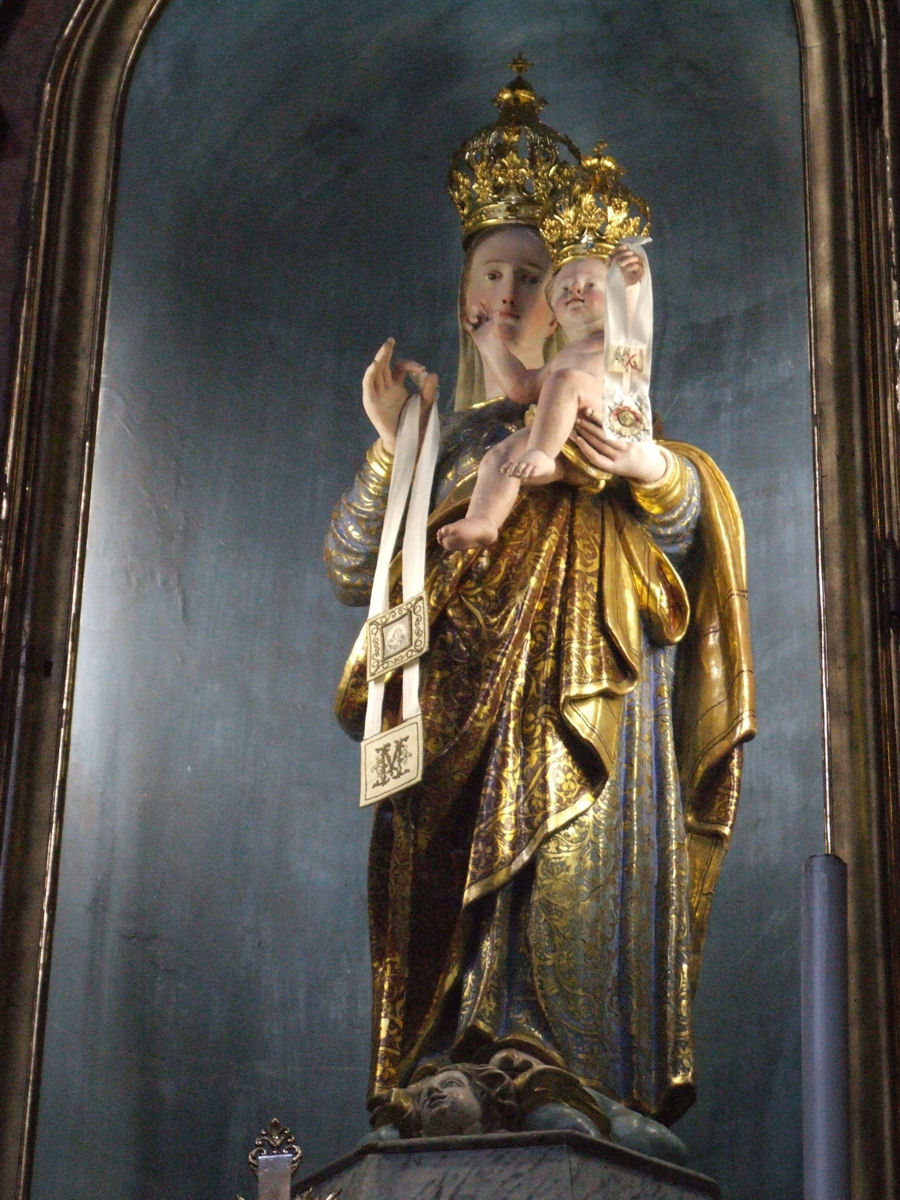
Crowned Virgin of Carmel, Varallo Sesia, Italy

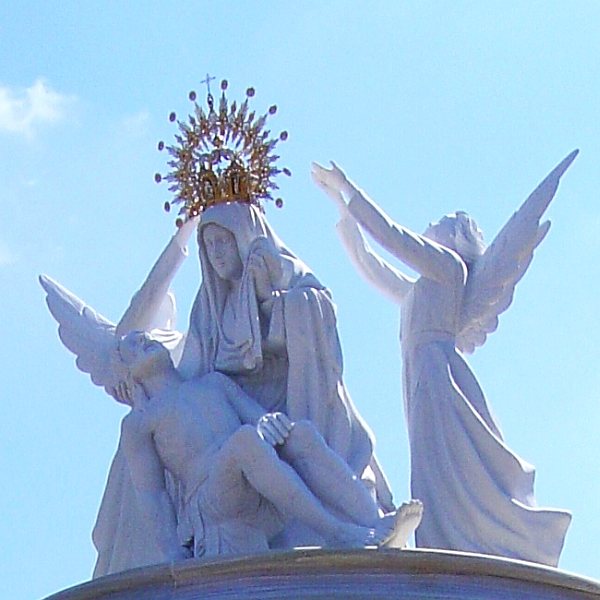
Crowned statue of the Blessed Virgin, Spain

=== Frescoes ===
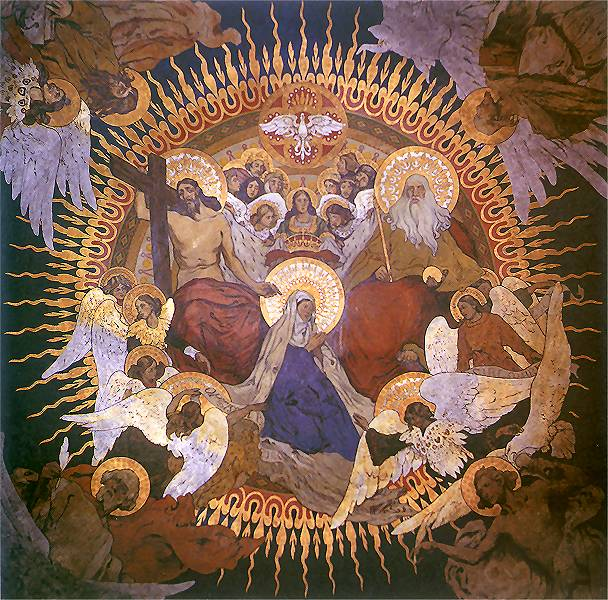
Tetmajer Madonna in Heaven, 1895

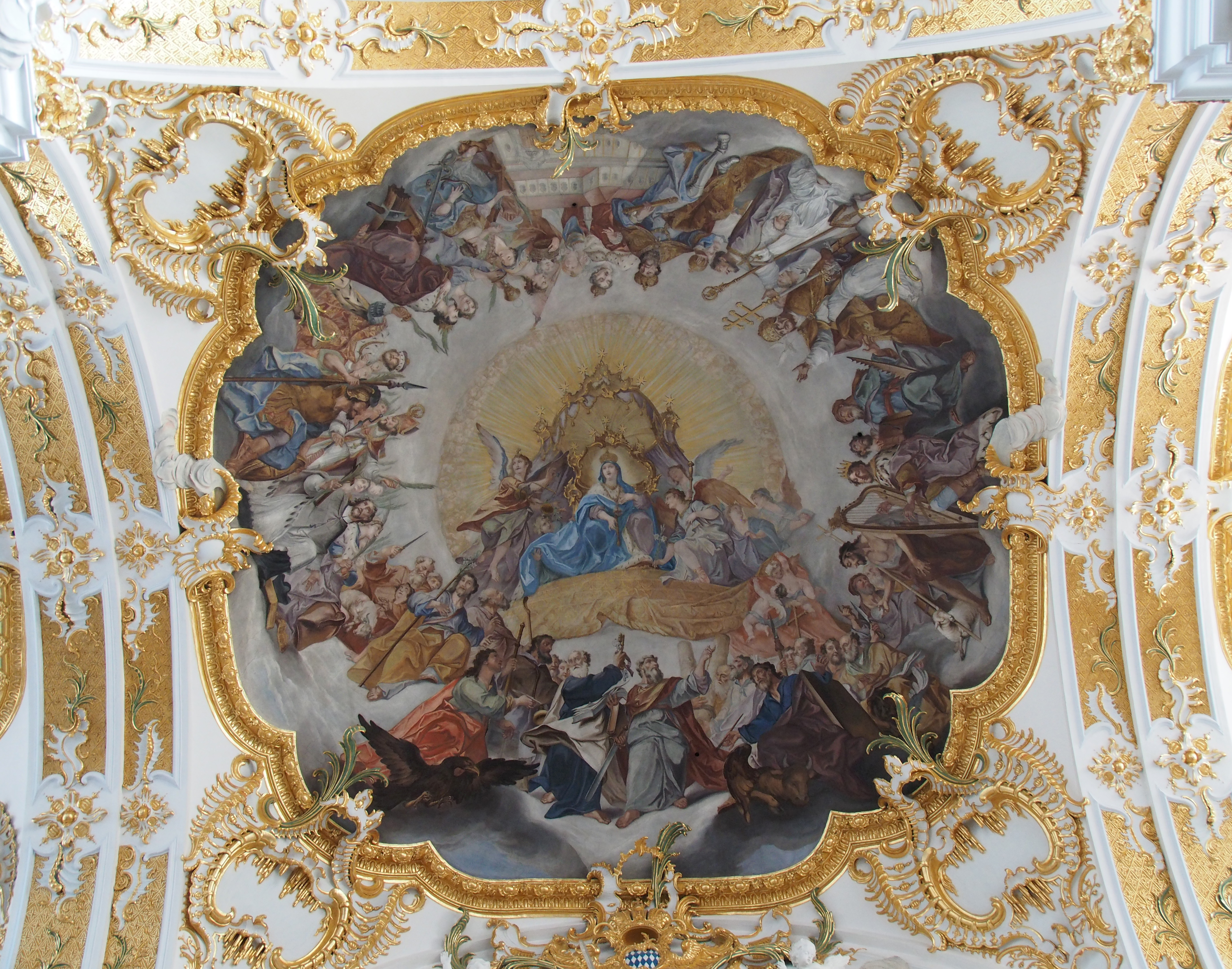
Scheffler, Queen of Heaven, Regensburg, Germany

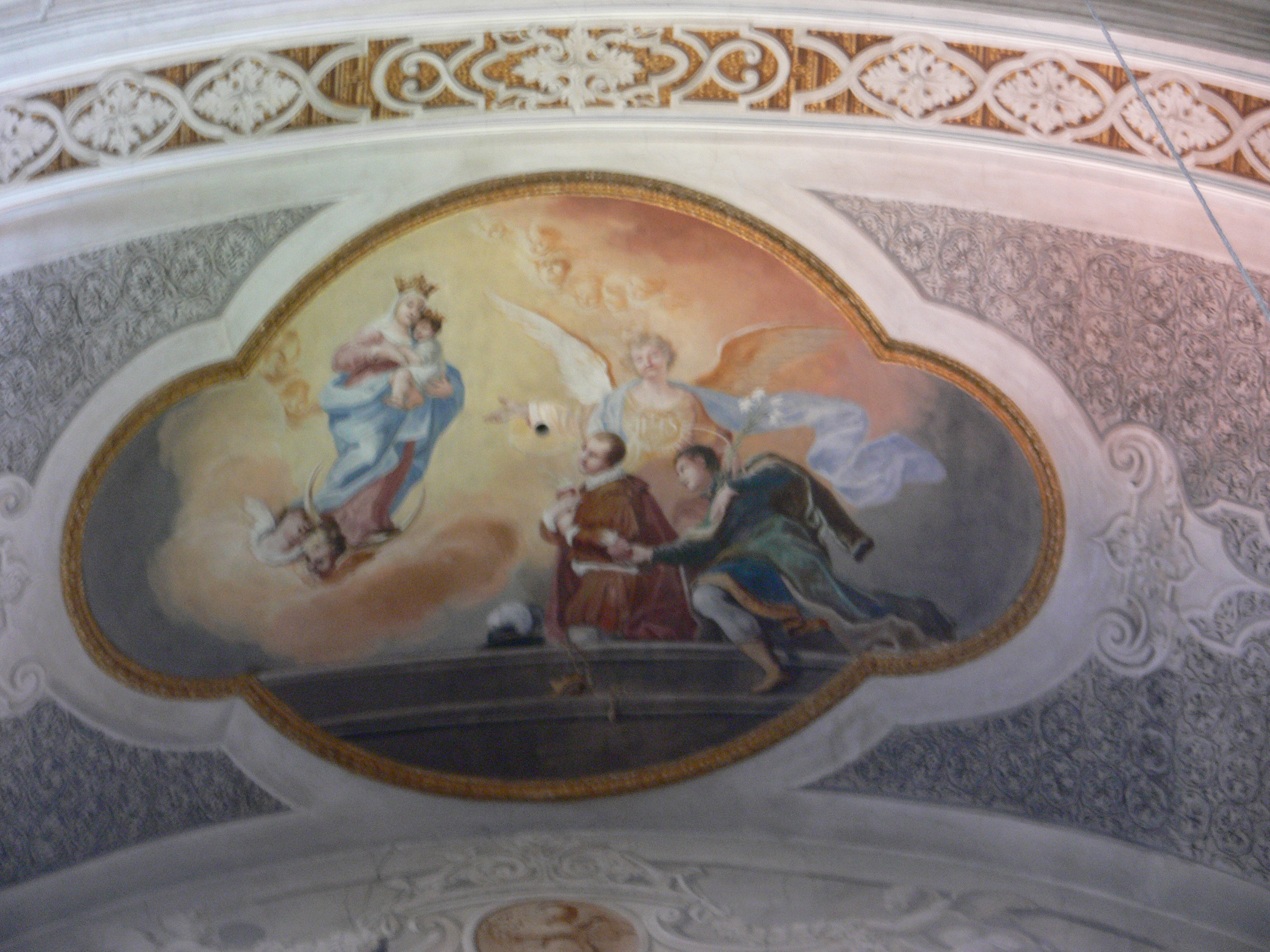
Scheffler, Crowned Virgin

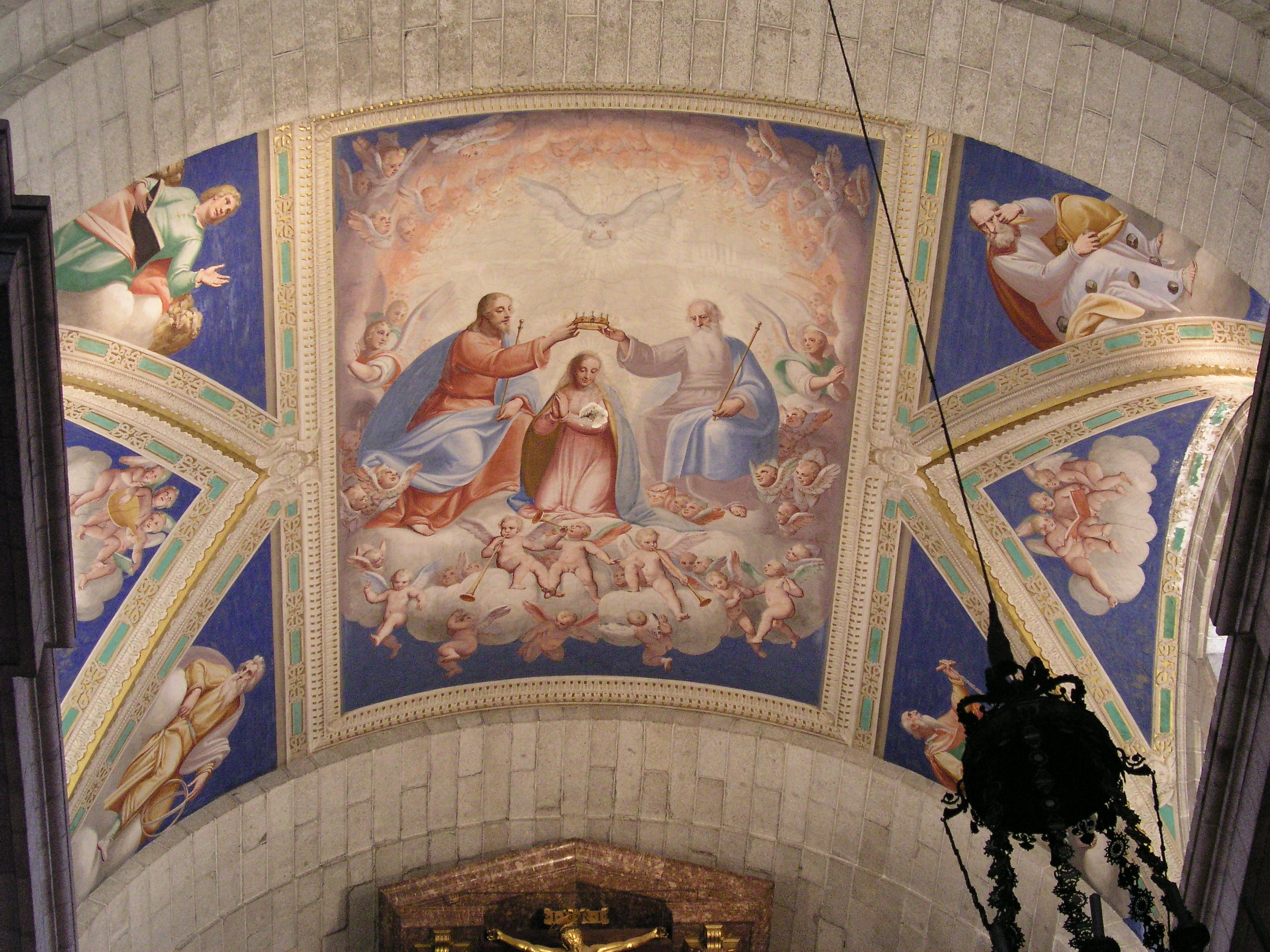
El Escorial Monastery Spain

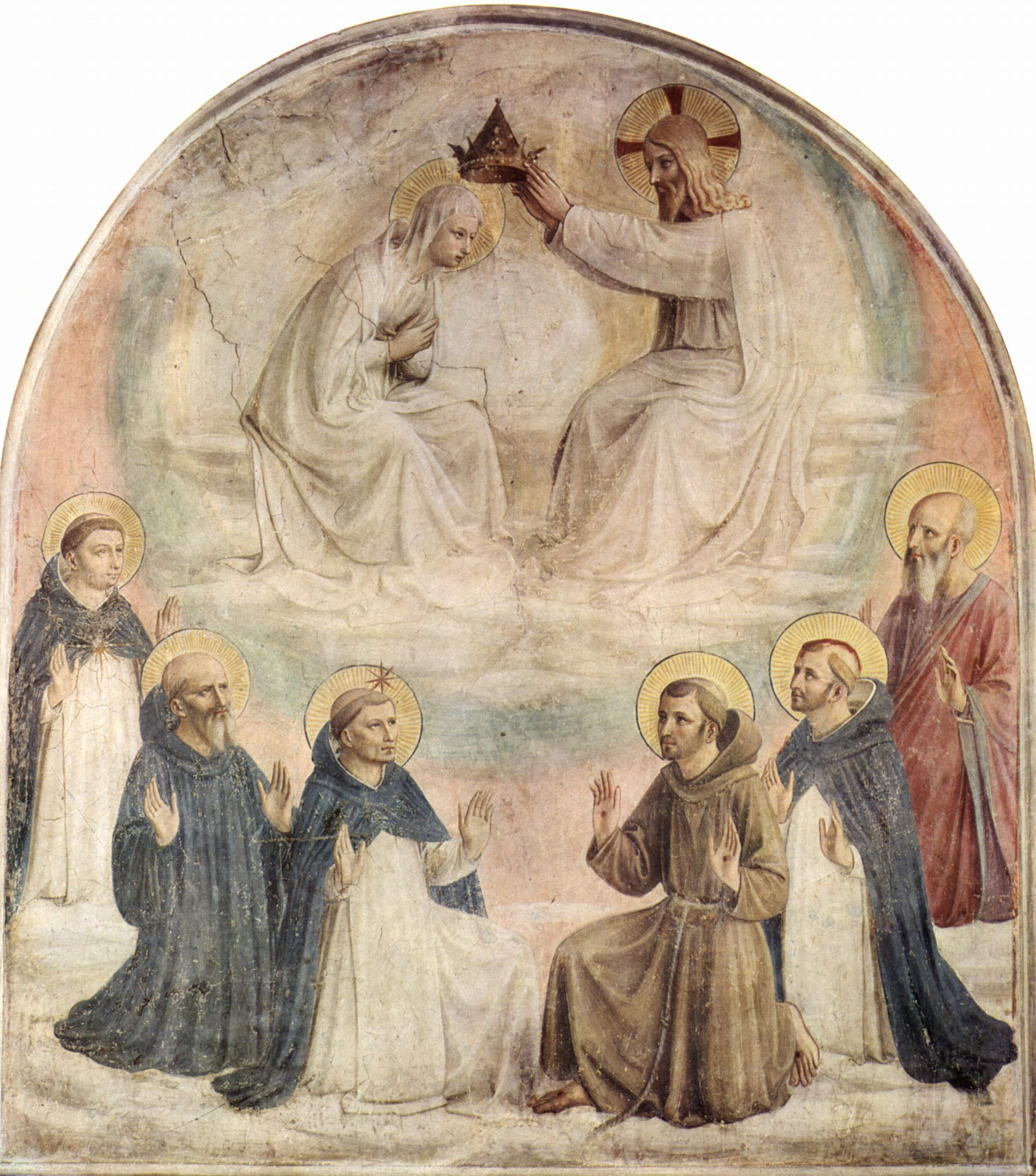
Fra Angelico, Florence, 1437–1446

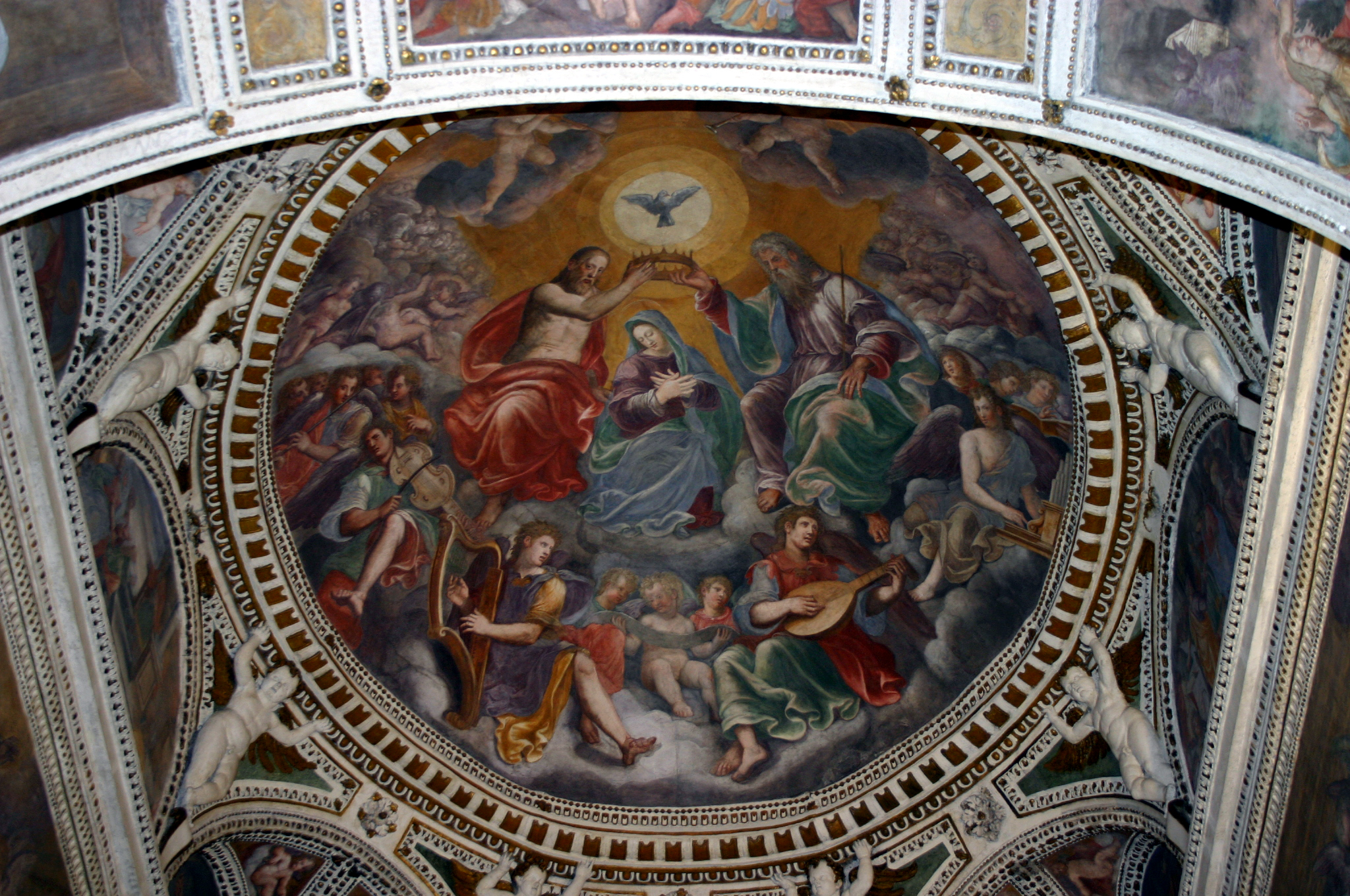
Church of Sant'Angelo, Milan

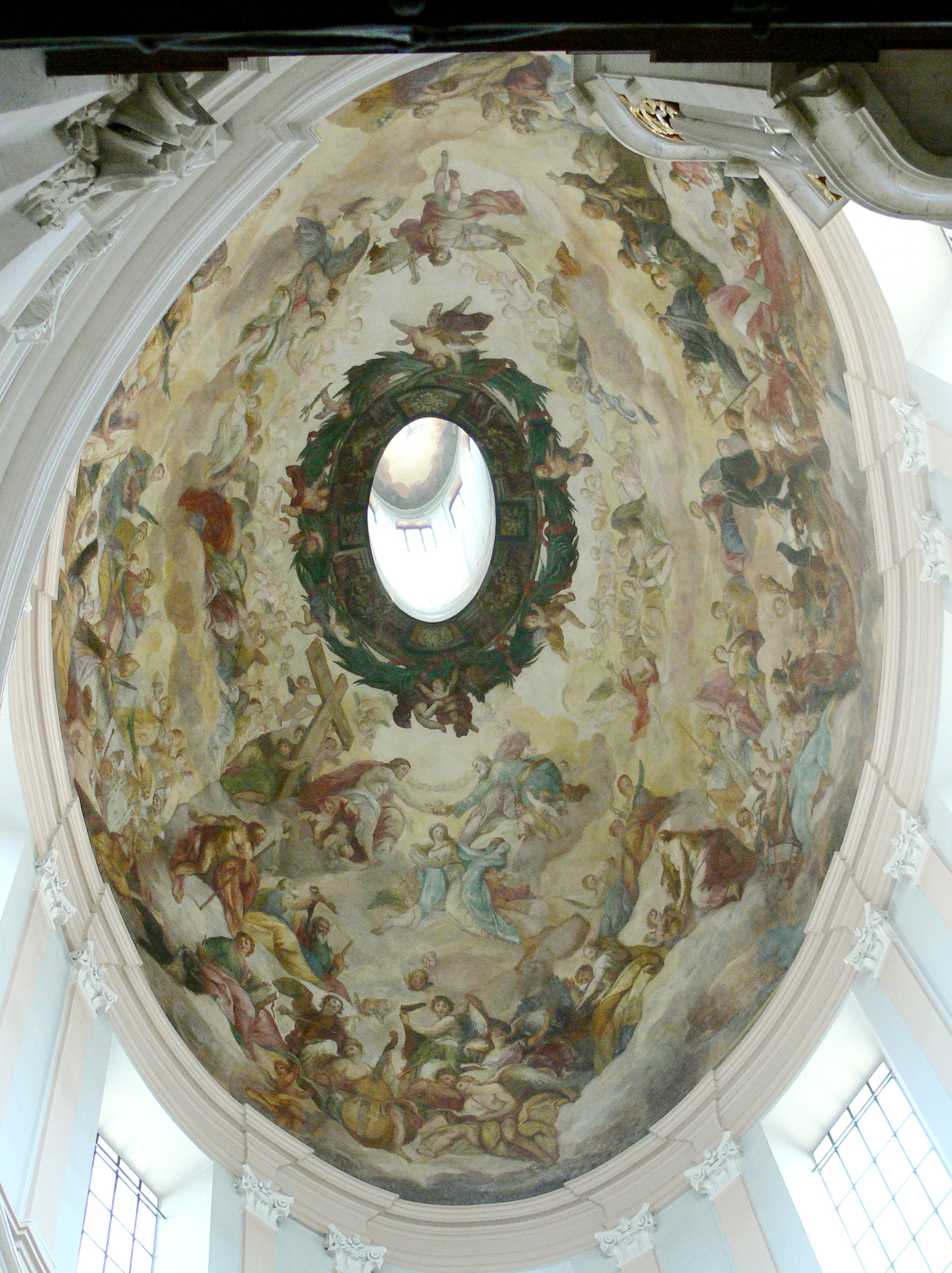
Salzburg, 1697–1700

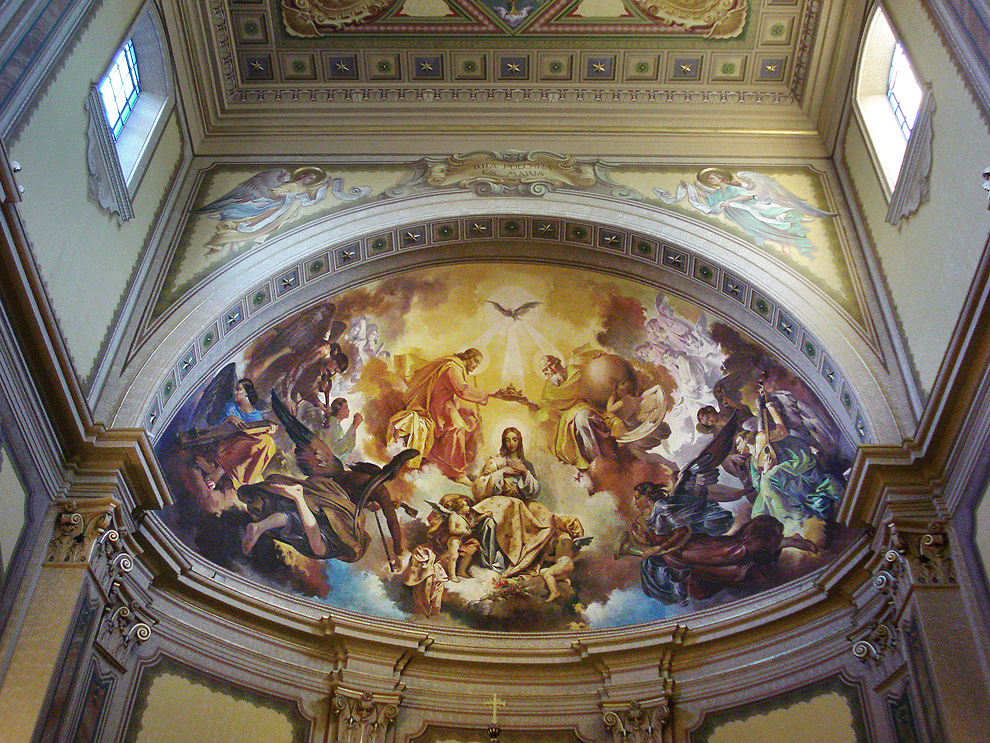
Aldo Locatelli, 20th century, Brazil

=== Altars ===
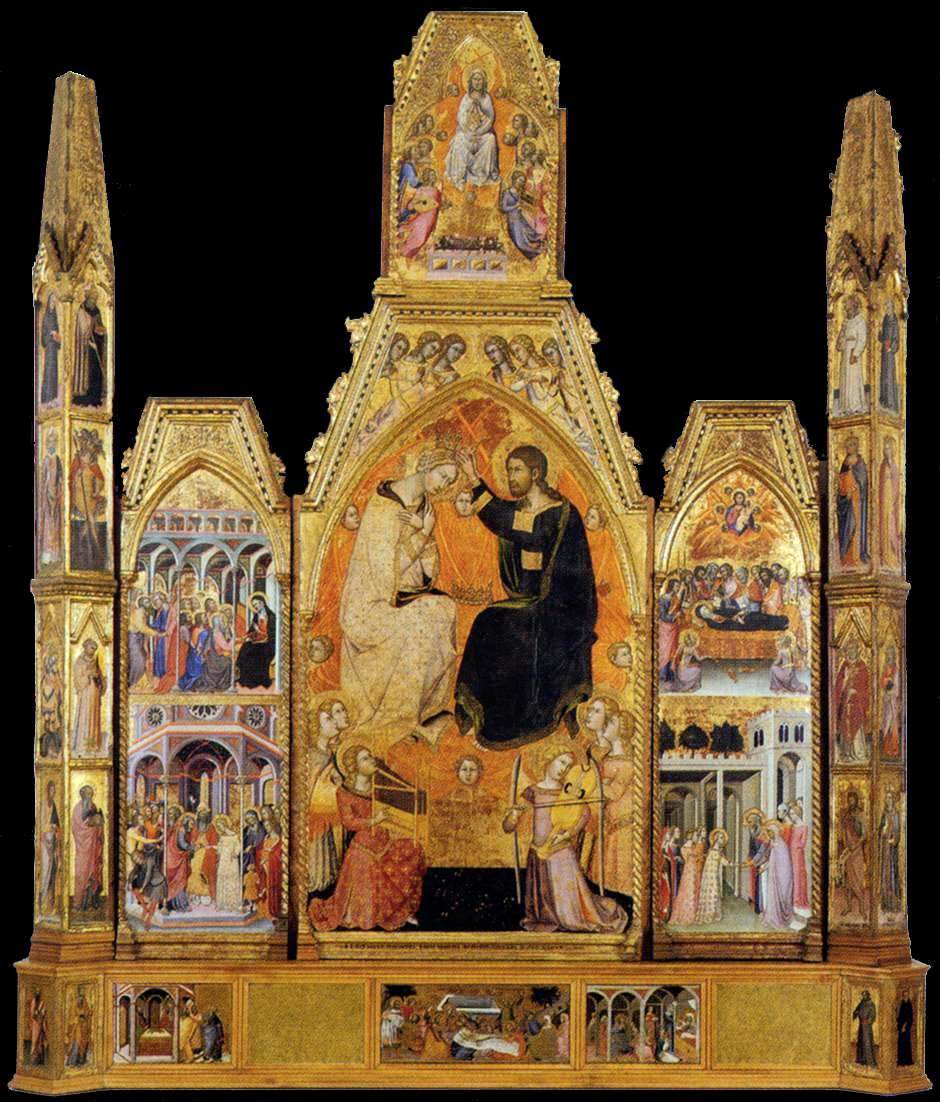
Coronation of the Virgin, Bartolo di Fredi, 1388

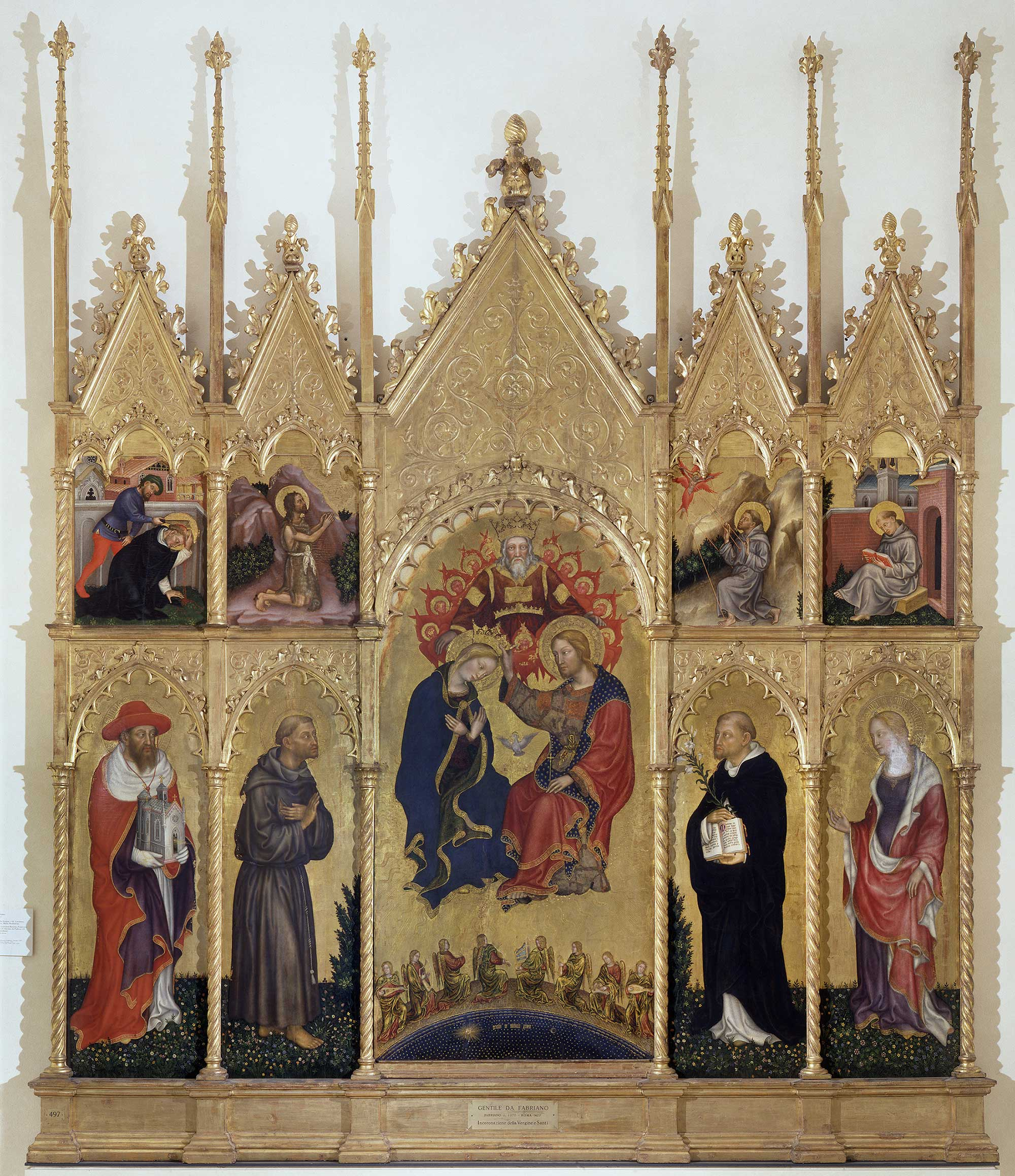
Gentile da Fabriano Altarpiece

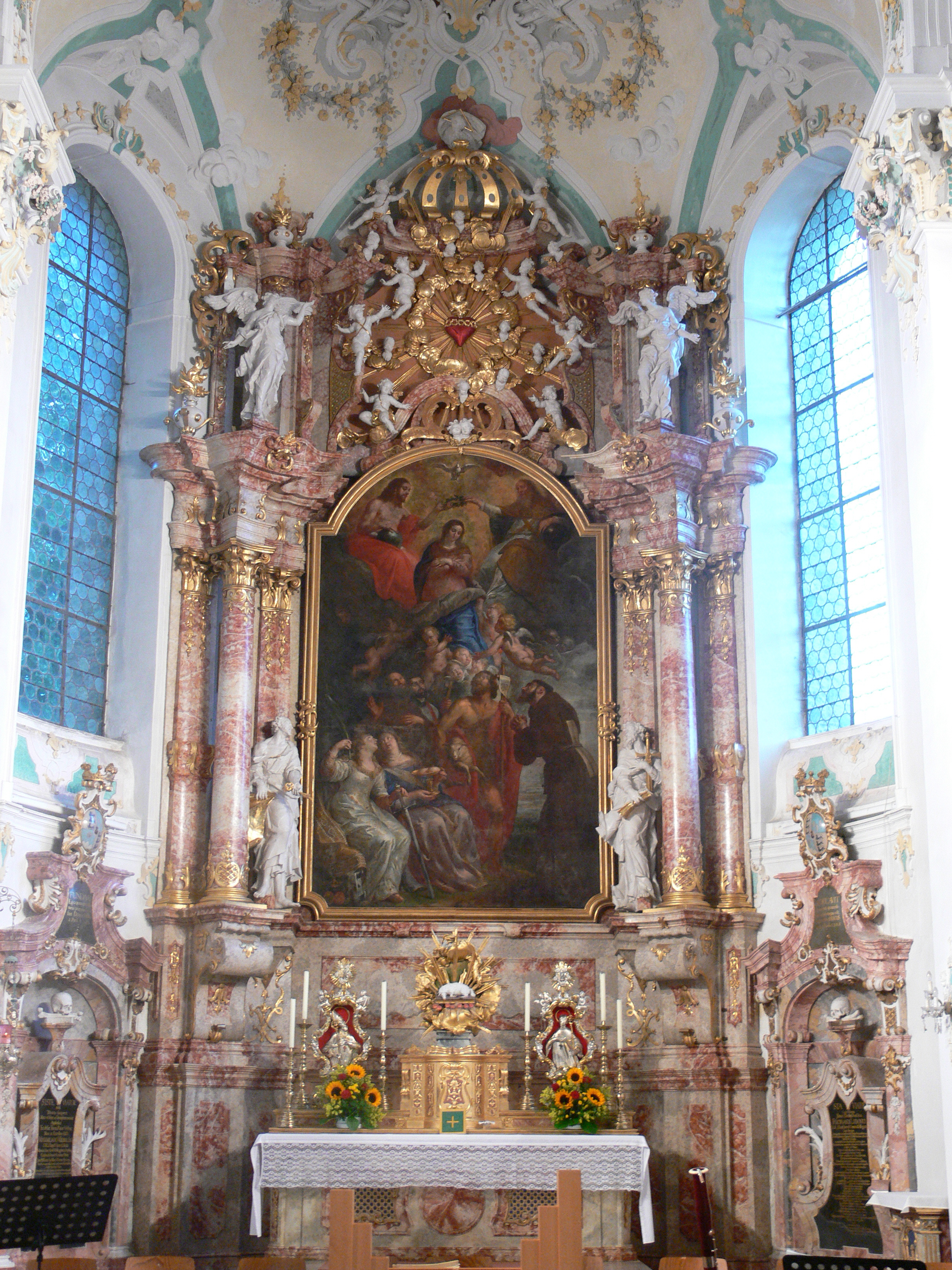
18th-century German altar

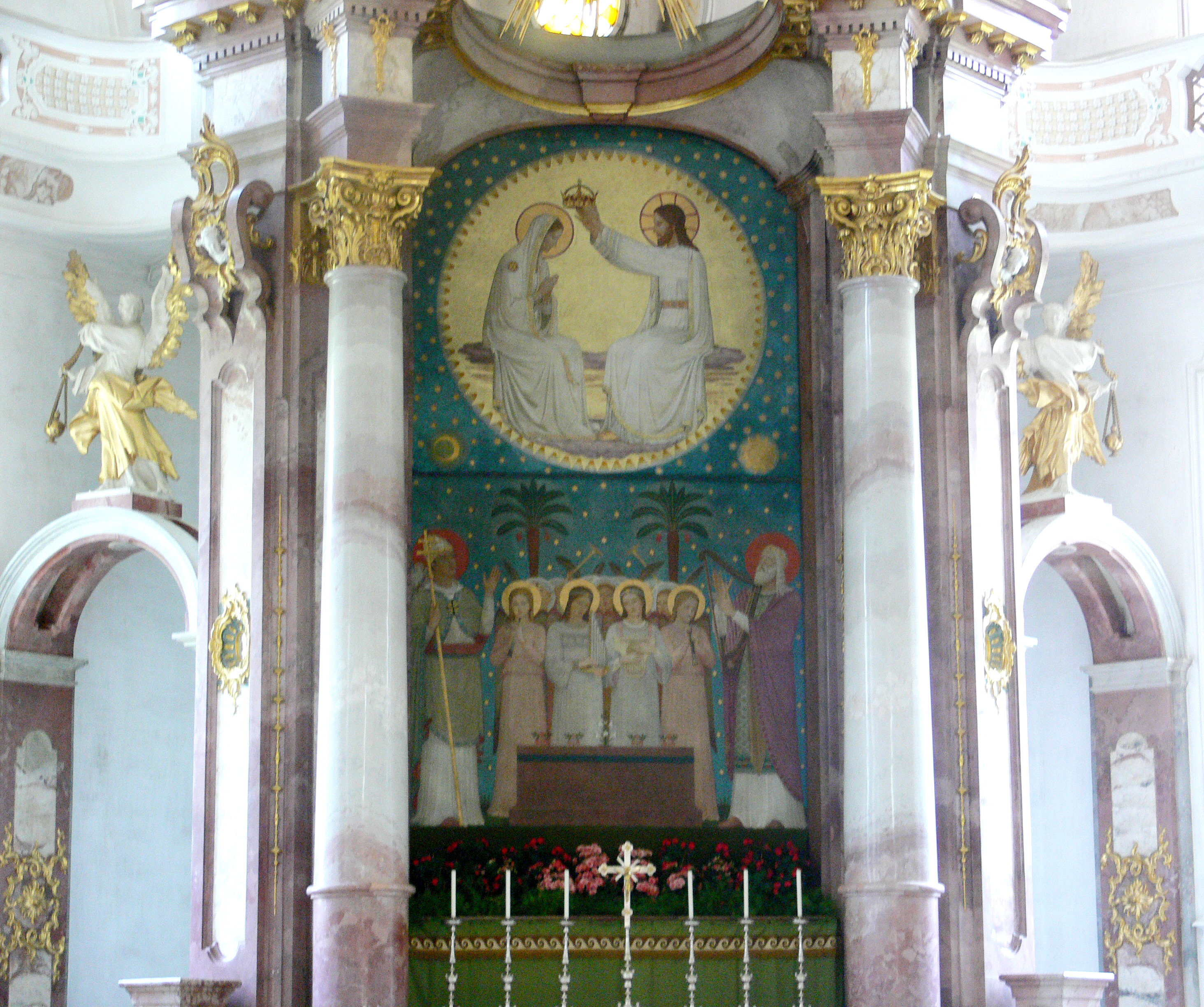
19th-century German altar

== See also ==
- Mother of the Church
- Seat of Wisdom
