= Tetmajer =

Tetmajer is a surname. Notable people with the surname include:

- Ludwig von Tetmajer (1850–1905), Hungarian/Swiss engineer
- Włodzimierz (Przerwa-)Tetmajer (1861–1923), Polish painter, half brother of Kazimierz
- Kazimierz Przerwa-Tetmajer (1865–1940), Polish poet, novelist, playwright, journalist, and author

== See also ==
- Przerwa (disambiguation)
