= Przerwa =

Przerwa may refer to:

- Przerwa, Łódź Voivodeship, Poland
- Przerwa, Opole Voivodeship, Poland

== See also ==
- Kazimierz Przerwa-Tetmajer (1865–1940), Polish poet
