= Smolarnia, Opole Voivodeship =

Smolarnia Pechhütte
- Village
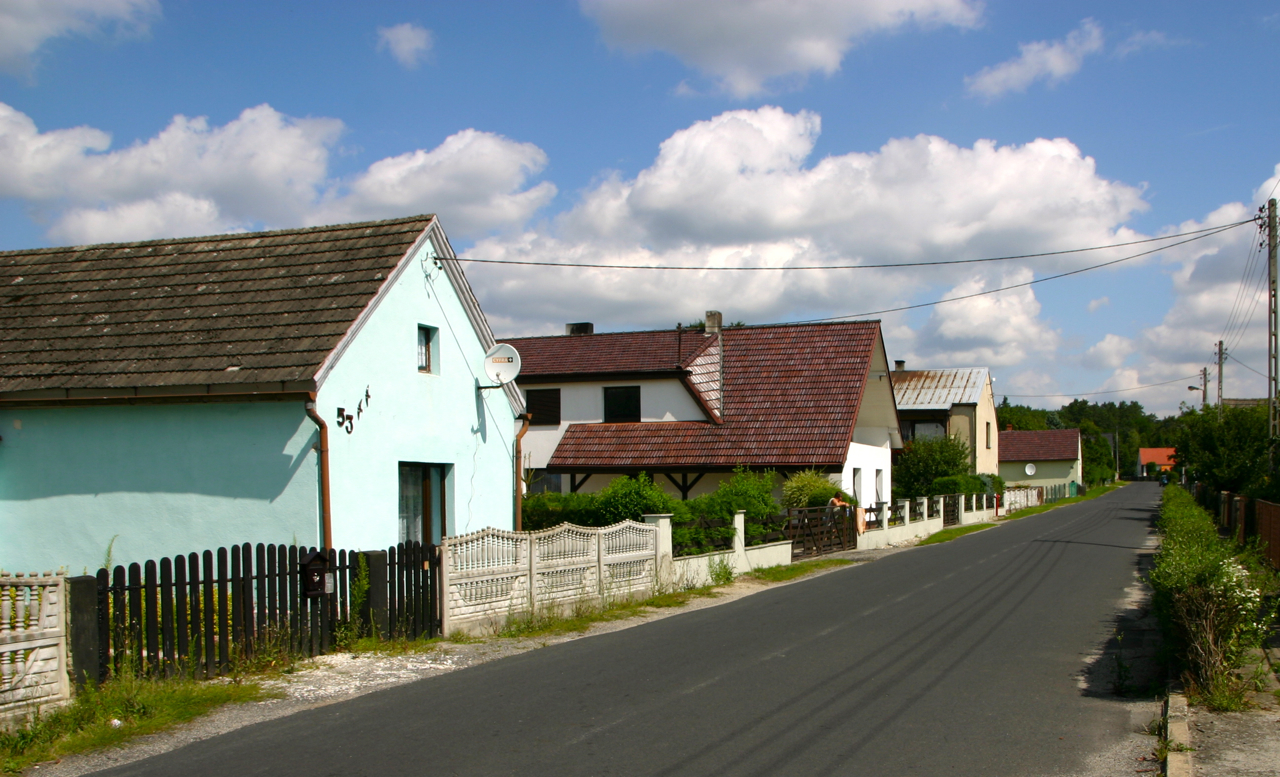

- Location within Poland
- Coordinates: 50°29′N 17°47′E
- Country: Poland
- Voivodeship: Opole
- County: Krapkowice
- Gmina: Strzeleczki
- Elevation: 186 m (610 ft)
- Time zone: UTC+1 (CET)
  - Summer (DST): UTC+2 (CEST)
- Vehicle registration: OKR

Smolarnia ([smɔˈlarɲa], additional name in German: Pechhütte) is a village in the administrative district of Gmina Strzeleczki, within Krapkowice County, Opole Voivodeship, in Upper Silesia in southern Poland.

The nearby hamlet of Serwitut is administered as part of this village.

== History ==
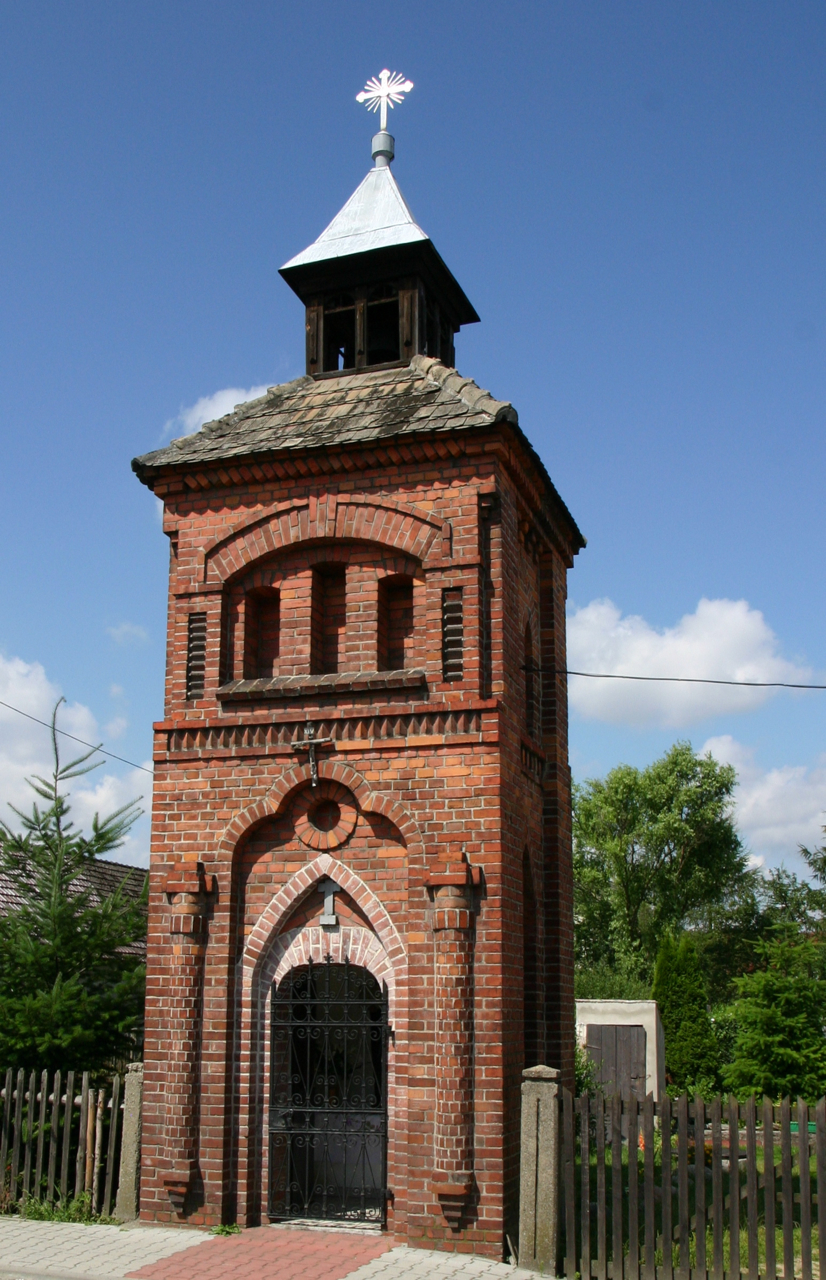
Bell tower

In the 10th century, the territory became part of the emerging Polish state under its first historic ruler Mieszko I. Following the fragmentation of Poland, it formed part of several provincial duchies ruled by the Piast dynasty, and later on it passed to the Kingdom of Bohemia. The village itself can trace its history back to 12 November 1663, when a large estate was granted to a nobleman which later became the center of the village, attracting settlers from nearby villages. The village's name was first recorded as Dziedzützer Pechhüte, indicating it was a hamlet of Dziedzice (as was nearby Serwitut). Its name derives from the pitch industry that occupied the villagers. The Polish name, Smolarnia, does not appear before the 19th century, and was first recorded in an official record from 1828. The parish church for Pechhütte and Serwitut was in Polnisch Rasselwitz (Racławiczki).

In the 18th century, the village was annexed by Prussia. German documents of the early 19th century do not provide separate census data for Pechhütte and Servitut, but in the 1830s there were counted between Pechhütte (Smolarnia), Serwitut, and Sedschütz (Dziedzice) 44 households with 420 inhabitants. In 1871, it became part of Germany. By the 1890s there were 25 families living in the village. However, there was very little arable land, as much of the area was taken up by the forest, an Easement property called the Oberglogauer Servitutwald because it was owned by the wealthy Oppersdorff family from Oberglogau (Głogówek). So, many of the villagers had to work in the forest and on nearby estates. In World War I several soldiers from the village died, but the village itself, like most of Germany, was untouched by physical damage. In 1915, Pechhütte and Serwitut had 1,111 inhabitants.

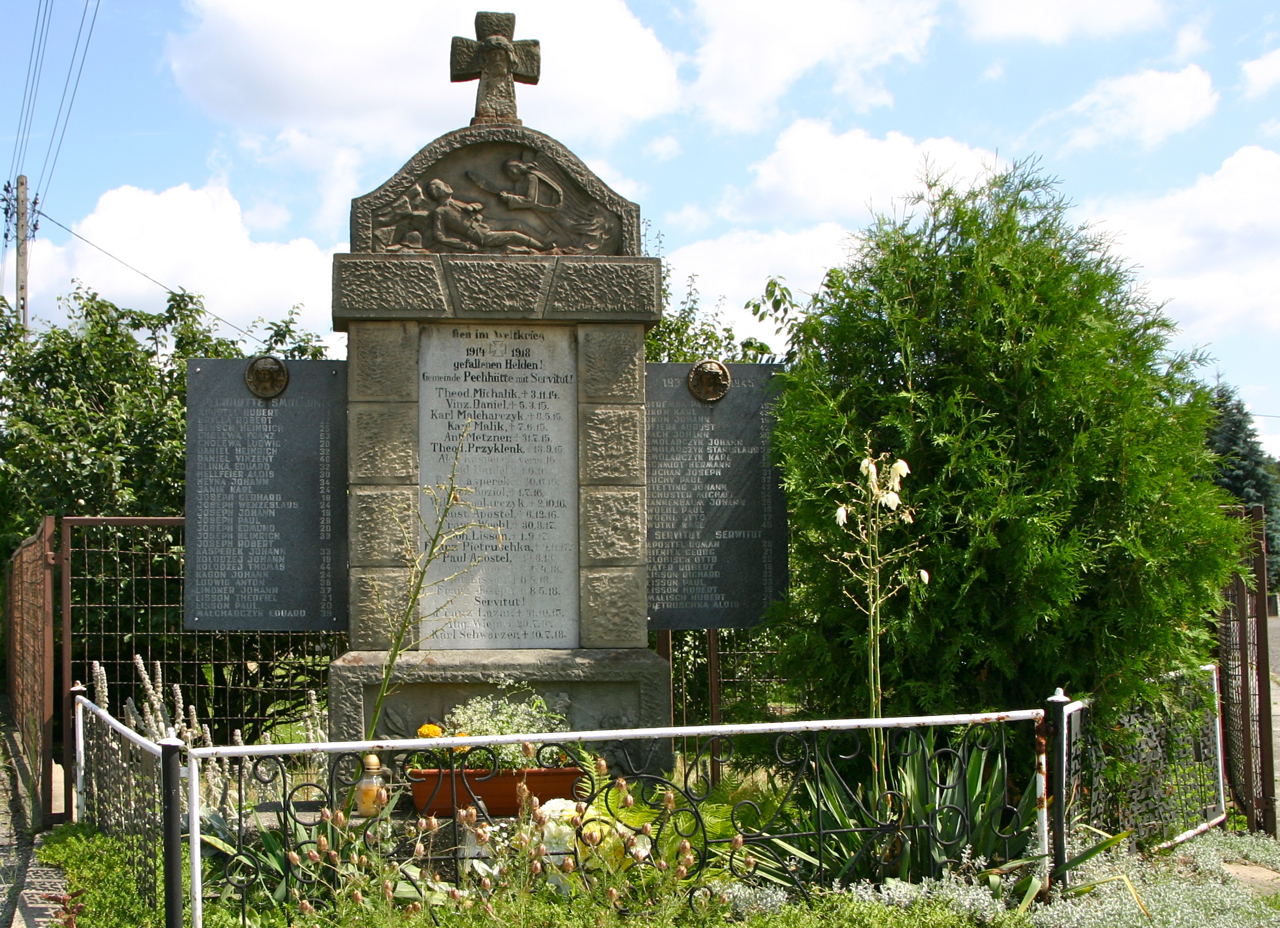
War memorial

In the Upper Silesia plebiscite of 20 March 1921, 541 villagers voted to remain with Germany and 321 voted to rejoin Poland, which just regained independence. As a result, Pechhütte remained in Germany. Before 1945 it belonged to the district of Landkreis Neustadt O.S. Up until 1945 the forest around Pechhütte, by then known as the Sedschützer Servitutwald belonged to Count Klaus von Tiele-Winkler of Moschen (Moszna). During the war, the village suffered minimal damage, with only the school burning down.

Following Germany's defeat in World War II, in 1945, Silesia became again part of Poland, and the remaining German population of the village was largely expelled in accordance with the Potsdam Agreement, dramatically reducing the village's population; it has not since reached its former size. The village was renamed to its historic Polish name Smolarnia and included within the newly created Silesian Voivodeship. In 1950 it was reassigned to Opole Voivodeship, and in 1999 reassigned from Prudnik County to Krapkowice County. On 17 May 2006, German was declared an additional auxiliary language alongside the official Polish language, and on 24 November 2008 the old name German name Pechhütte was recognized as an additional name along the official Polish name Smolarnia.

In the center of the village, there is a memorial to the soldiers from Smolarnia killed in World War I and II.

== See also ==
- Prudnik Land
