= Kujawa =

Kujawa may refer to:

== Places ==
- Kujawa, Kuyavian-Pomeranian Voivodeship, Poland
- Kujawa, Lubusz Voivodeship, Poland
- Duża Kujawa, a village in north-central Poland

== Other ==
- Kujawa (surname)
- Kujawa Elementary School, see Aldine Independent School District#Early childhood schools

== See also ==
- Kujau (disambiguation), a similar surname
- Kujawiak, a Polish folk dance
- Kujawy (disambiguation)
