= Amerykan =

- Village
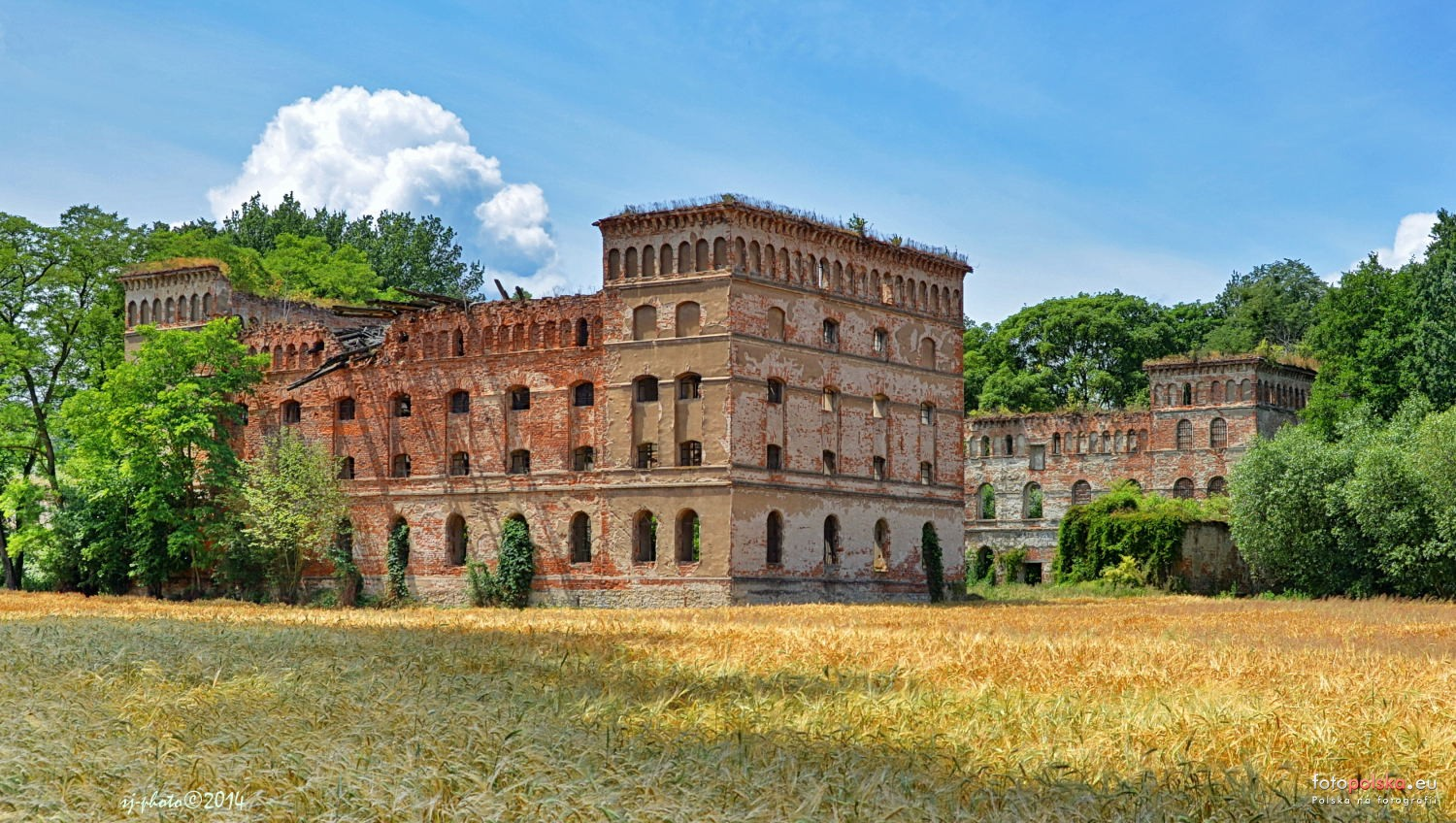
- Historic mill complex

- Location within Poland
- Coordinates: 50°25′19″N 17°52′55″E
- Country: Poland
- Voivodeship: Opole
- County: Krapkowice
- Gmina: Strzeleczki
- First mentioned: 17 November 1301
- Time zone: UTC+1 (CET)
  - Summer (DST): UTC+2
- Area code: +48 77
- Vehicle registration: OKR

Amerykan (German: Amerikon) is a village in the administrative district of Gmina Strzeleczki, within Krapkowice County, Opole Voivodeship, southern Poland. It is situated in the historical region of Prudnik Land.

The village is uninhabited. Ruins of a historic mill complex are located here.

== History ==
The first written mention of two watermills in the area of Pisarzowice is dated 17 November 1301. They were owned by the Cistercians. By 1502, only one mill was still operating. Until 1532 it was part of the Piast-ruled Duchy of Opole and Racibórz formed as a result of the medieval fragmentation of Poland into smaller duchies. Afterwards, it was integrated into the Bohemian Crown and Habsburg Empire, administratively becoming part of Głogówek County (circulus superioris Glogoviae) until 1742, and returning to Polish rule under the House of Vasa from 1645 to 1666. In 1646, the mill complex was acquired by the Oppersdorff family. After the First Silesian War, it was annexed by the Kingdom of Prussia was incorporated into Prudnik County (Großkreis Neustadt).

Count von Oppersdorff modernized the mills in the early 1860s, based on a design by Oliver Evans. Because the mills operated on an "American system", the village became known locally as Amerikon in German and Amerykan in Polish. In 1930, businessman Pius Ianocha purchased the property from the Oppersdorff family and expanded it into a small agricultural estate. There was also a sawmill in the complex.

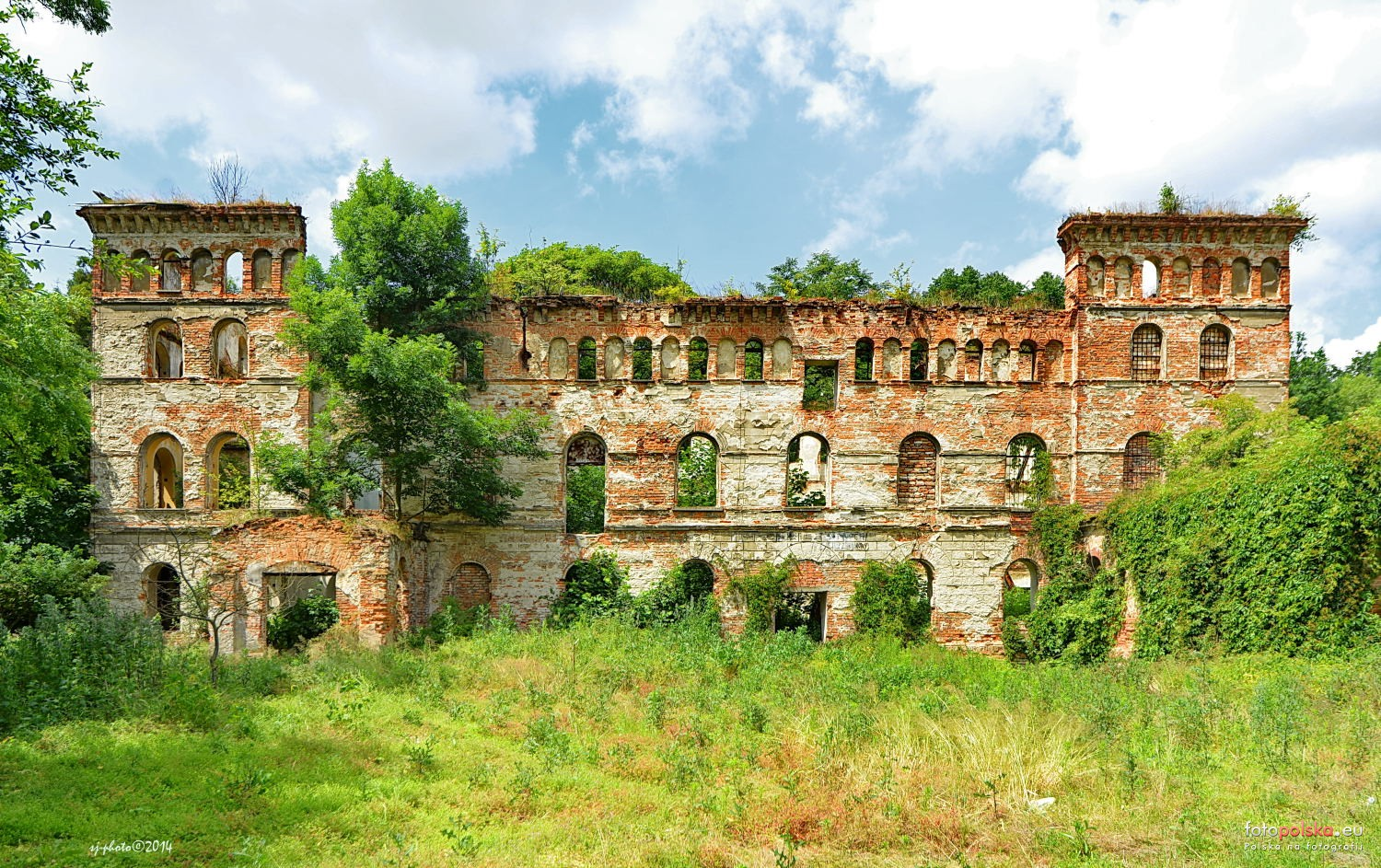
Ruins

Following the Second World War, from March to May 1945, Prudnik County was controlled by the Soviet military commandant's office. On 11 May 1945, it was passed on to the Polish administration. Since then, some of the buildings in Amerykan served as a weapons depot and a storage facility. The mill itself was no longer in operation. The Ianocha family owned the mill complex until the 1970s, after which the property was abandoned. The surrounding lands have remained in agricultural use, but the mill complex has fallen into ruin.
