= Kujawy (disambiguation) =

Kujawy, or Kuyavia, is a region of north-central Poland. It may also refer to:

== Places ==
- Drążdżewo-Kujawy, a village in east-central Poland
- Kujawy, Kuyavian-Pomeranian Voivodeship, a village in north-central Poland
- Kujawy, Masovian Voivodeship, a village in east-central Poland
- Kujawy, Opole Voivodeship, a village in south-west Poland
- Kujawy, Pomeranian Voivodeship, a settlement in northern Poland
- Kujawy, Świętokrzyskie Voivodeship, a village in south-central Poland
- Kujawy mine, a salt mine in northern Poland

== Other uses ==
- Kujawy Markowice, a football club based in Markowice
