= Łowkowice, Krapkowice County =

Łowkowice Lobkowitz
- Village
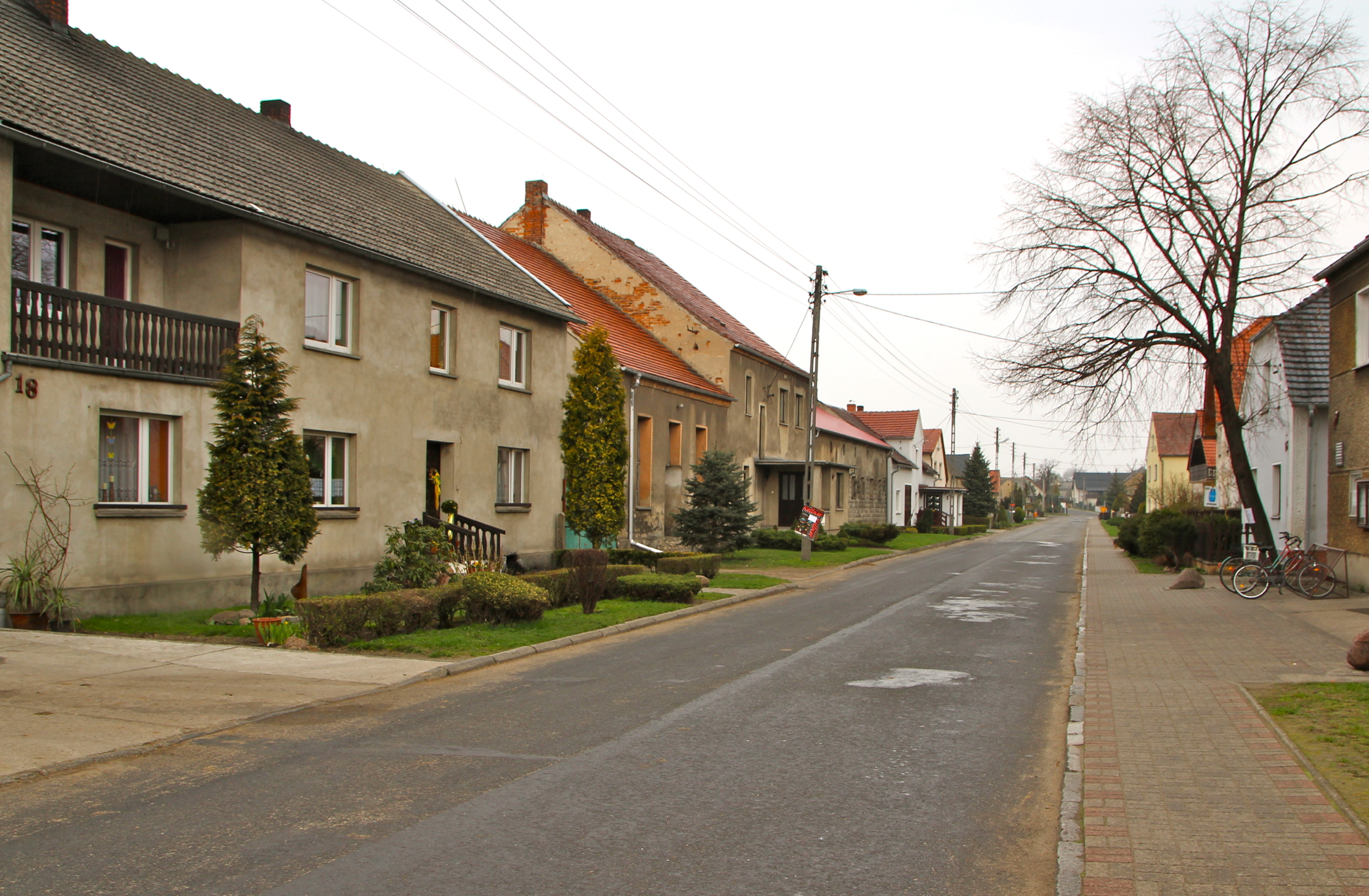

- Location within Poland
- Coordinates: 50°26′15″N 17°53′15″E
- Country: Poland
- Voivodeship: Opole
- County: Krapkowice
- Gmina: Strzeleczki

Population
  - Total: 575
- Time zone: UTC+1 (CET)
  - Summer (DST): UTC+2 (CEST)
- Vehicle registration: OKR

Łowkowice ([wɔfkɔˈvit͡sɛ], additional name in German: Lobkowitz) is a village in the administrative district of Gmina Strzeleczki, within Krapkowice County, Opole Voivodeship, in the southern Polish region of Upper Silesia.

Since 2006 the village, like the entire commune, has been bilingual in Polish and German.

== History ==
The village had already invested in German town law in the early 13th century, and was first mentioned in written documents as Lofcovici in 1218, when it was part of Piast-ruled Poland. It was later named in 1534 as Lowkowitz. The name is thought to derive from the name Łowek. During the Middle Ages the town frequently changed hands, before finally in 1561 passing to the Oppersdorff family of Oberglogau (Głogówek). In the 18th century the village passed to the Kingdom of Prussia, and in 1871 it became part of unified Germany, within which it belonged to the district of Landkreis Neustadt O.S. In 1936 the Nazi government renamed the village Jägershausen to erase traces of Polish origin.

In 1945 the village became again part of Poland and the German population was largely expelled in accordance with the Potsdam Agreement. The village was renamed to its historic name Łowkowice. The village was administratively part of the Silesian Voivodeship. In 1950 it was reassigned to Opole Voivodeship, and in 1999 reassigned from Prudnik County to Krapkowice County. On 17 May 2006 the entire commune of Strzeleczki was declared bilingual in Polish and German, and on 24 November 2008 the old name German name Lobkowitz was also made official.

== Sights ==
The village windmill was built in 1868 of brick, and was recently renovated by a private owner and converted into a restaurant. The town park and palace, dating to the late 19th century and built for a landowning family, are privately owned. The town chapel, also built of brick, also dates to the 19th century.

== See also ==
- Prudnik Land
