= Kujawa (surname) =

Kujawa coat of arms variant of Leszczyc coat of arms used by some of Kujawa family

Kujawa is a Polish surname. Archaic feminine forms are Kujawina (by husband), Kujawianka (by father); they still can be used colloquially. Some of them use Leszczyc coat of arms, see also pl:Kujawa (herb szlachecki). Notable people with the surname include:

- Dawid Kujawa (born 1981), Polish speedway rider
- Dawid Kujawa (born 1989), literary critic
- Jens Kujawa (born 1965), German basketball player
- Radosław Kujawa (born 1965), Polish political military commander who head been the Head of the Military Intelligence Service
- Rafał Kujawa (born 1988), Polish footballer
- Robert Kujawa (1925–2008), American musician known by his stage name as Bob Kames
- Romuald Kujawa (born 1962), Polish footballer
- Serge Kujawa (1924–2014), Canadian politician and lawyer
- Sharon Kujawa, American audiologist

== See also ==
- Kujawy
- Kujawski
