= Zielina =

Zielina Zellin
- Village
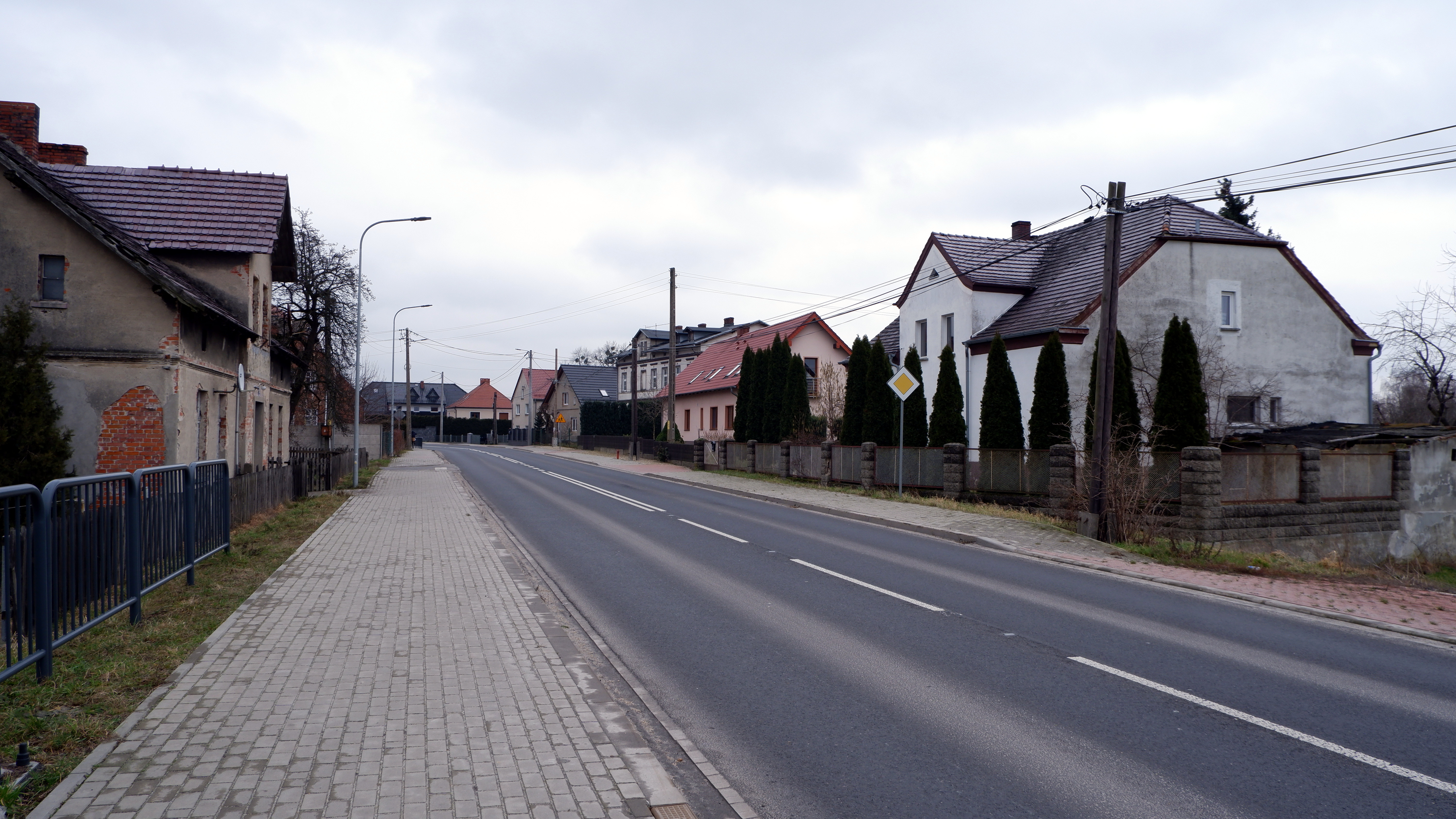

- Location within Poland
- Coordinates: 50°26′N 17°50′E
- Country: Poland
- Voivodeship: Opole
- County: Krapkowice
- Gmina: Strzeleczki

Population
  - Total: 689
- Time zone: UTC+1 (CET)
  - Summer (DST): UTC+2 (CEST)
- Vehicle registration: OKR

Zielina ([ʑɛˈlina], additional name in German: Zellin) is a village in the administrative district of Gmina Strzeleczki, within Krapkowice County, Opole Voivodeship, in southern Poland.

== History ==
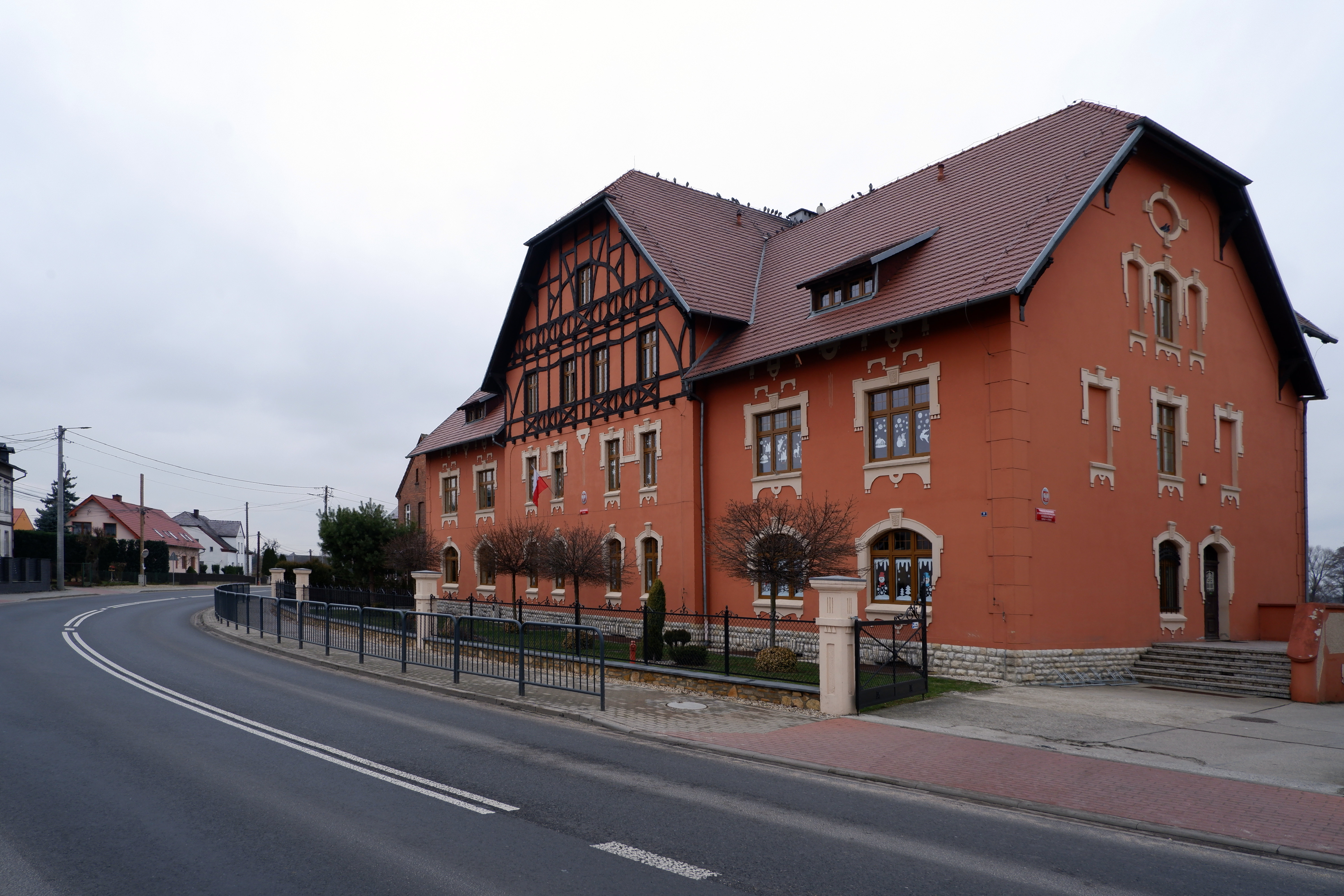
Elementary school

The town was first mentioned as Zellin in 1743, and was originally a hamlet belonging to the town of Kujau (Kujawy). In the 18th century it was one of the estates of the counts of Schaffgotsch. In the Upper Silesia plebiscite of 20 March 1921 337 villagers voted to remain with Germany and 139 voted to join the newly restored state of Poland. As a result, Dobrau remained in Germany. Until 1945 it was located in Kreis Neustadt O.S.. From the 1930s until 1945 the town was owned by Claus von Thiele-Winckler.
