= Wawrzyńcowice =

Wawrzyńcowice Lorenzdorf
- Village
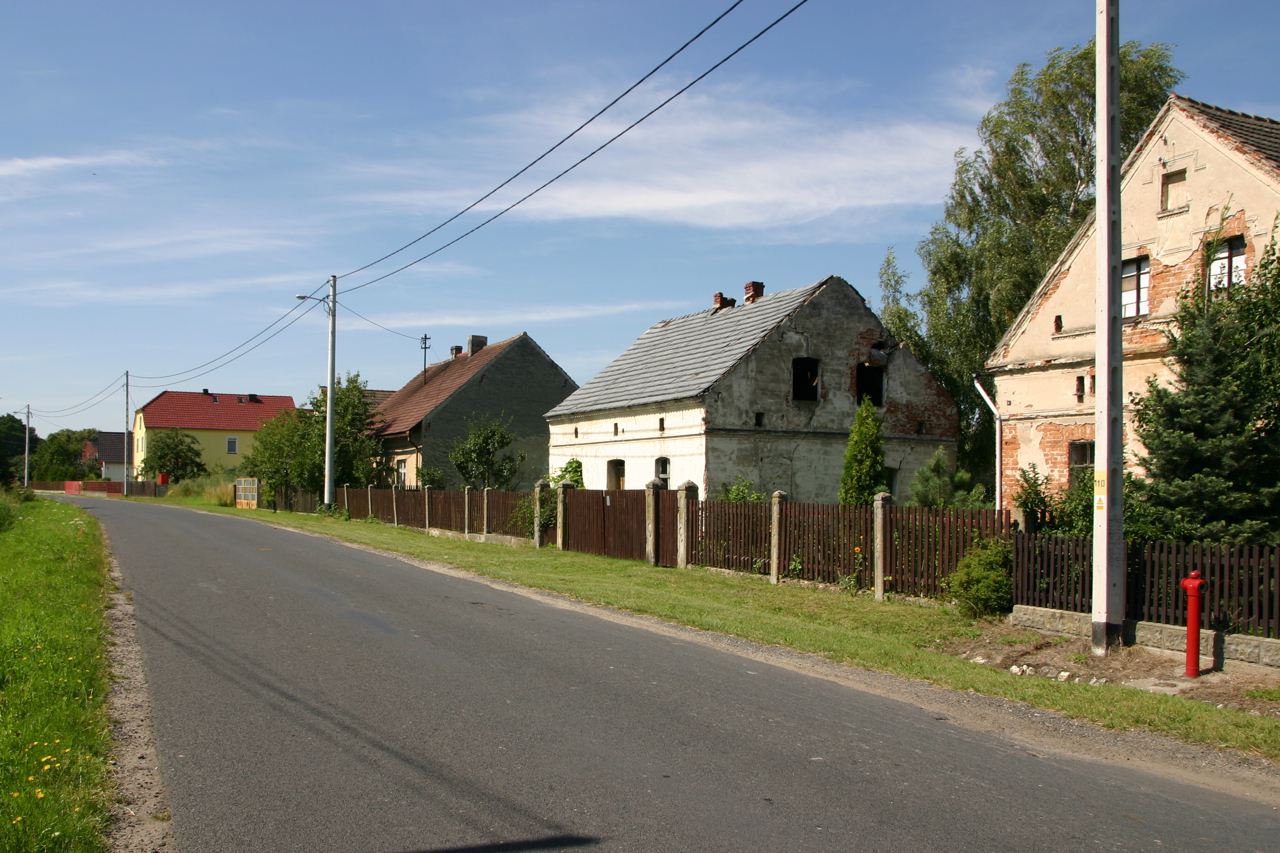

- Location within Poland
- Coordinates: 50°25′N 17°49′E
- Country: Poland
- Voivodeship: Opole
- County: Krapkowice
- Gmina: Strzeleczki

Population
  - Total: 86
- Time zone: UTC+1 (CET)
  - Summer (DST): UTC+2 (CEST)
- Vehicle registration: OKR

Wawrzyńcowice ([vavʐɨɲt͡sɔˈvit͡sɛ], additional name in German: Lorenzdorf) is a village in the administrative district of Gmina Strzeleczki, within Krapkowice County, Opole Voivodeship, in the southern Polish region of Upper Silesia.

Since 2006 the village, like the rest of the commune, has been bilingual in Polish and German.

== History ==
The village was first mentioned in 1679 as Wawrzinowice. The town's name derived from the name Lawrence (Wawrzyniec in Polish, Lorenz in German), which is also the derivation of the village's German name, Lorenzdorf (Lawrence's village). Initially the village was in the possession of the noble House of Schaffgotsch, then in 1821 it passed to Baron Seherr-Thoss, who sold it in the 1860s to Major Thiele-Winckler von Miechowitz, whose family owned the village until World War II. Before 1945 it belonged to the district of Landkreis Neustadt O.S.

In 1945 the village passed to Poland and the German population was largely expelled in accordance with the Potsdam Agreement. The village was renamed Wawrzyńcowice and annexed to the newly created Silesian Voivodeship. In 1950 it was reassigned to Opole Voivodeship. In 1999, it was reassigned from Prudnik County to Krapkowice County. On 17 May 2006, the entire commune of Strzeleczki was declared bilingual in Polish and German, and on 24 November 2008 the old name German name Lorenzdorf was also made official.

== See also ==
- Prudnik Land
