= Bulawa (disambiguation) =

A bulawa (or bulava) is a ceremonial mace known in Poland, Russia, and Ukraine. Bulawa, Buława, or Bulava may also refer to:

- Buława, Opole Voivodeship (south-west Poland)
- Bulava (missile), Russian ballistic missile
- Olga Buława, Polish model, Miss Polski 2018
- Bulava (UAV), Ukrainian unmanned combat aerial vehicle (branded Mace for export)

== See also ==
- Bulava of the president of Ukraine, a ceremonial mace
