= Komorniki, Opole Voivodeship =

Komorniki Komornik
- Village
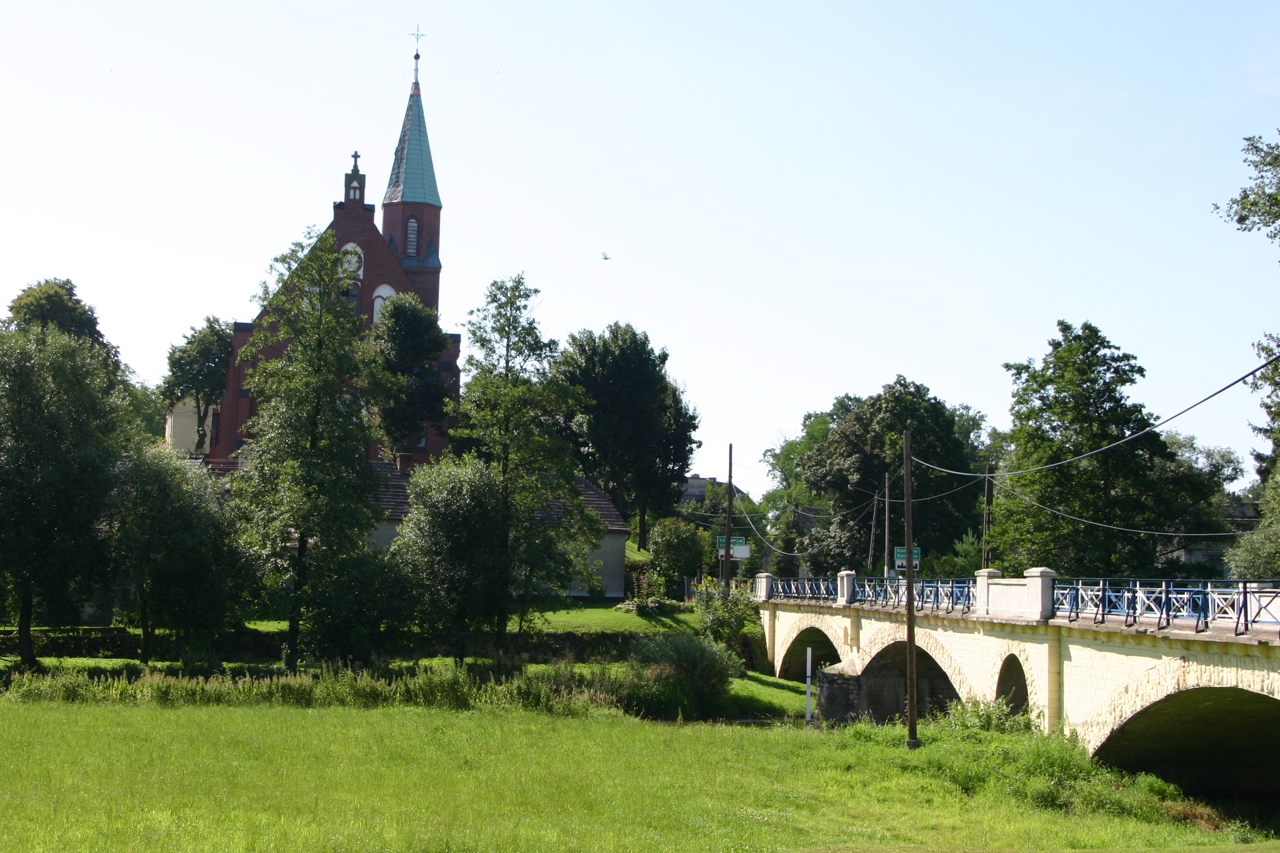

- Location within Poland
- Coordinates: 50°26′02″N 17°53′56″E
- Country: Poland
- Voivodeship: Opole
- County: Krapkowice
- Gmina: Strzeleczki

Population
  - Total: 476
- Time zone: UTC+1 (CET)
  - Summer (DST): UTC+2 (CEST)
- Vehicle registration: OKR

Komorniki ([kɔmɔrˈniki], additional name in German: Komornik) is a village in the administrative district of Gmina Strzeleczki, within Krapkowice County, Opole Voivodeship, in southern Poland.

The nearby hamlet of Nowy Młyn is administered as part of this village.

== History ==
The village of Komornik was first mentioned in 1245 by Duke Ladislaus I of Opole, who had provided it as a base for the construction of the Cistercian abbey at Lubiąż. Later on, however, the village was divided into two parts; one half was claimed by the Cistercians, which in 1810 became property of the Prussian state, while the second part belonged to the Oppersdorff family of Oberglogau (Głogówek).

The parish church in Komorniki was built in 1888 by Fr. Zarub, largely with funds collected from his predecessor, Fr. Jachnik. The temple was founded on the site of the old church, which had been demolished. The old Stations of the Cross were moved from the previous church.

== See also ==
- Prudnik Land
