= Dobra, Opole Voivodeship =

Dobra Dobrau
- Village
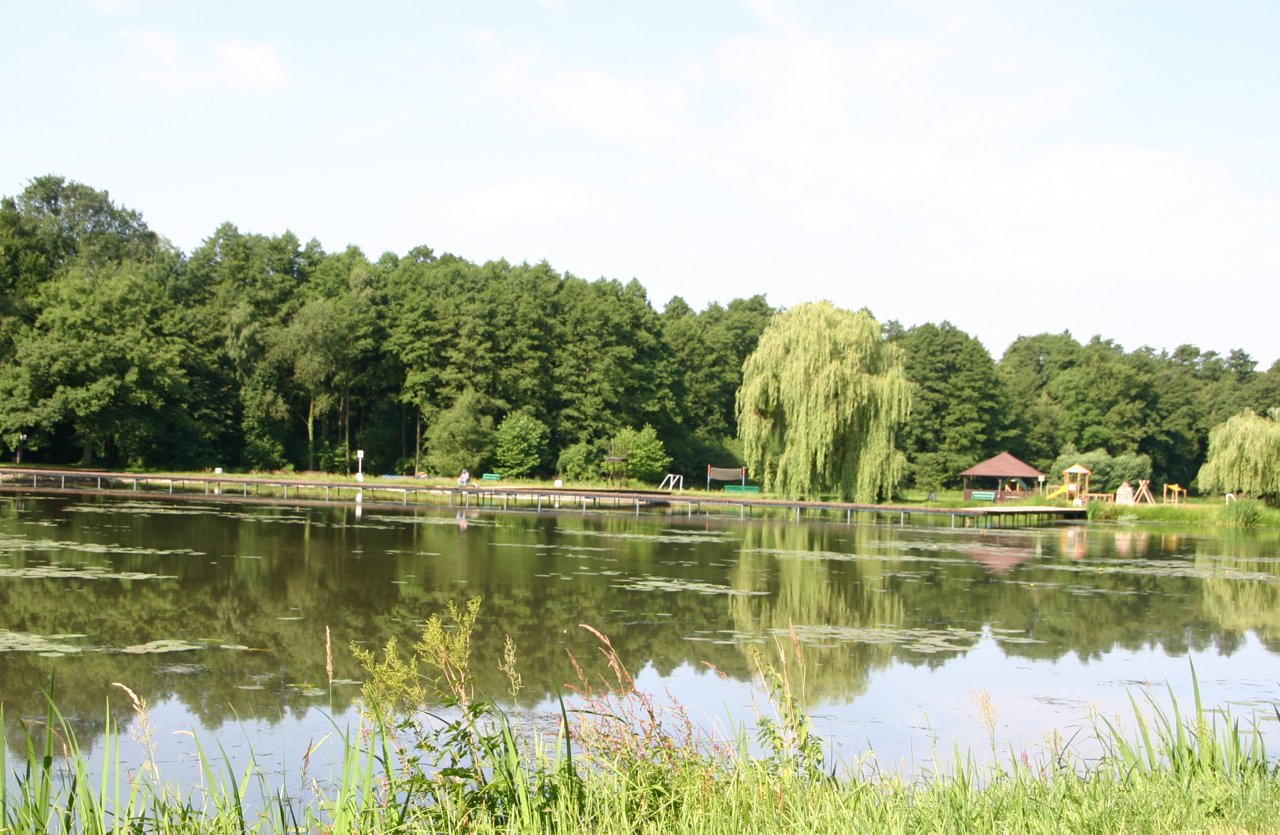

- Location within Poland
- Coordinates: 50°27′4″N 17°54′1″E
- Country: Poland
- Voivodeship: Opole
- County: Krapkowice
- Gmina: Strzeleczki
- First mentioned: 1228
- Population: 741
- Time zone: UTC+1 (CET)
  - Summer (DST): UTC+2 (CEST)
- Vehicle registration: OKR

Dobra ([ˈdɔbra], additional name in German: Dobrau) is a village in the administrative district of Gmina Strzeleczki, within Krapkowice County, Opole Voivodeship, in region of Upper Silesia in southern Poland.

The nearby hamlet of Nowy Bud is administered by this village.

== History ==
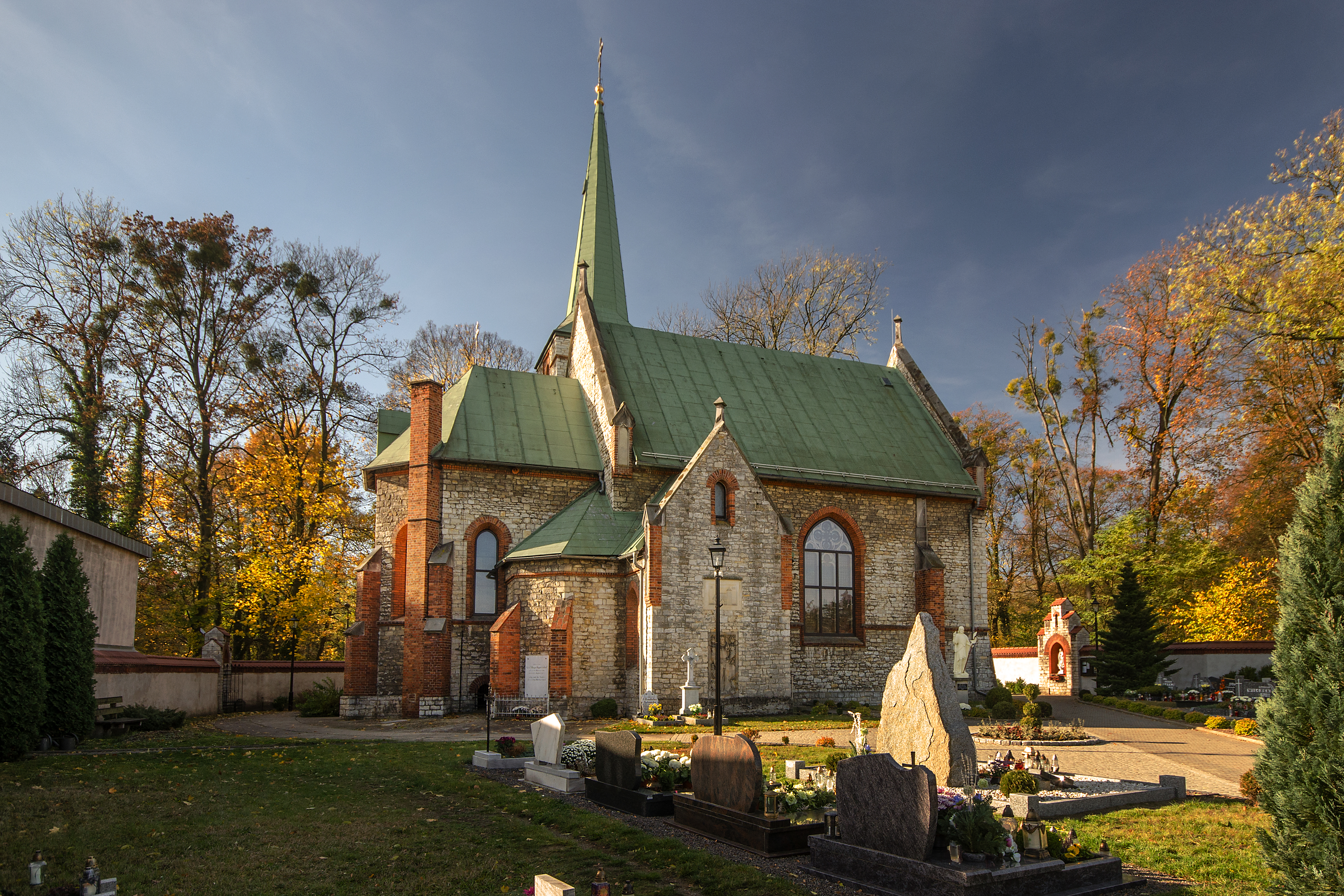
Saint John the Baptist church

Dobra was first mentioned in a document of Duke Casimir I of Opole from 1228, when it was part of fragmented Piast-ruled Poland. The name of the town derives from a Polish word for "good", and referred to the fertile soil of the area. Later on, the village was also part of Bohemia (Czechia), and in the 18th century it was annexed by the Kingdom of Prussia. Since 1780 the village was in the possession of Count Heinrich Seherr-Thoss, one of the biggest landowners in Silesia, who had a castle nearby. In 1867 the Catholic church was built with a donation from Countess Olga Seherr-Thoss. On the outside of the church is the tombstone of the knight Kasper Rogowski (d.1611), surrounded by eight heraldic crests.

In the Upper Silesia plebiscite of 20 March 1921, 419 villagers voted to remain with Germany and 76 voted to join the reestablished state of Poland. In the Dobrau Gutsbezirk, the local municipal council, 80 people voted for Germany and six for Poland. As a result, Dobrau remained in Germany. In 1933 the village had grown to 796 inhabitants. On 21 July 1936, during a massive Nazi campaign of renaming of placenames, the town was renamed Burgwasser to erase traces of Polish origin. During World War II, the German administration operated the E115 forced labour subcamp of the Stalag VIII-B/344 prisoner-of-war camp in the village. Before 1945 it belonged to the district of Landkreis Neustadt O.S. In the final stages of World War II the village was partially destroyed, first from 25 to 27 January and then again on 19 March 1945, when the historic palace was burned by the advancing Red Army.

After World War II, the village became again part of Poland and its historic name Dobra was restored. It was assigned to the Silesian Voivodeship. In 1950 it was reassigned to Opole Voivodeship, and in 1999 reassigned from Prudnik County to Krapkowice County.

== Sights ==
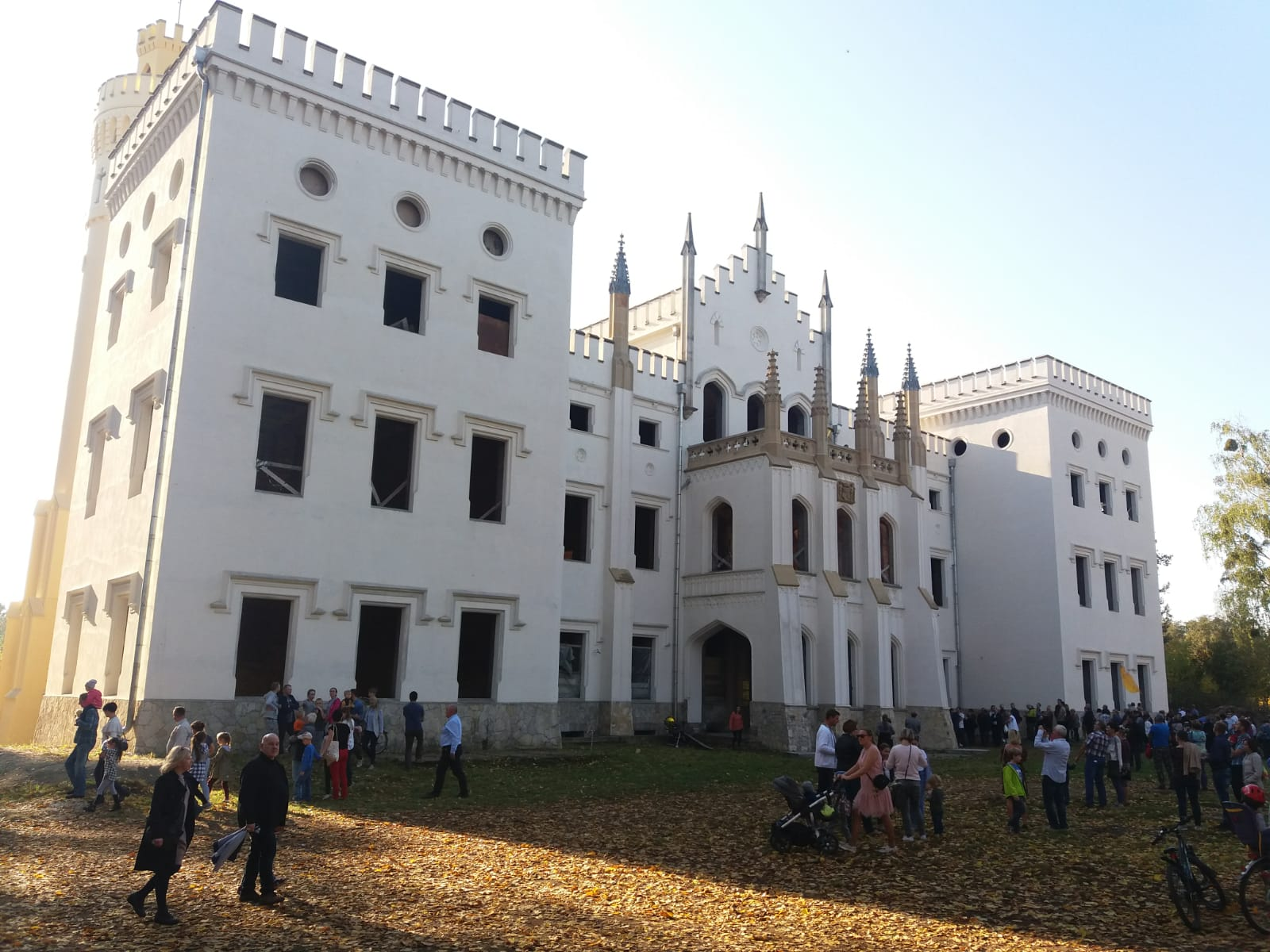
Dobra Palace

There is a neogothic palace near the village, built in 1720 for the Sehher-Thoss family and rebuilt 1857–60. The palace gardens were designed by Gustav Meyer, architect of many of Berlin's finest gardens, and contain many fine old trees. The palace, destroyed by the Russian army in 1945, is now in private hands and being renovated.

== See also ==
- Prudnik Land
