= Zbychowice =

- Village
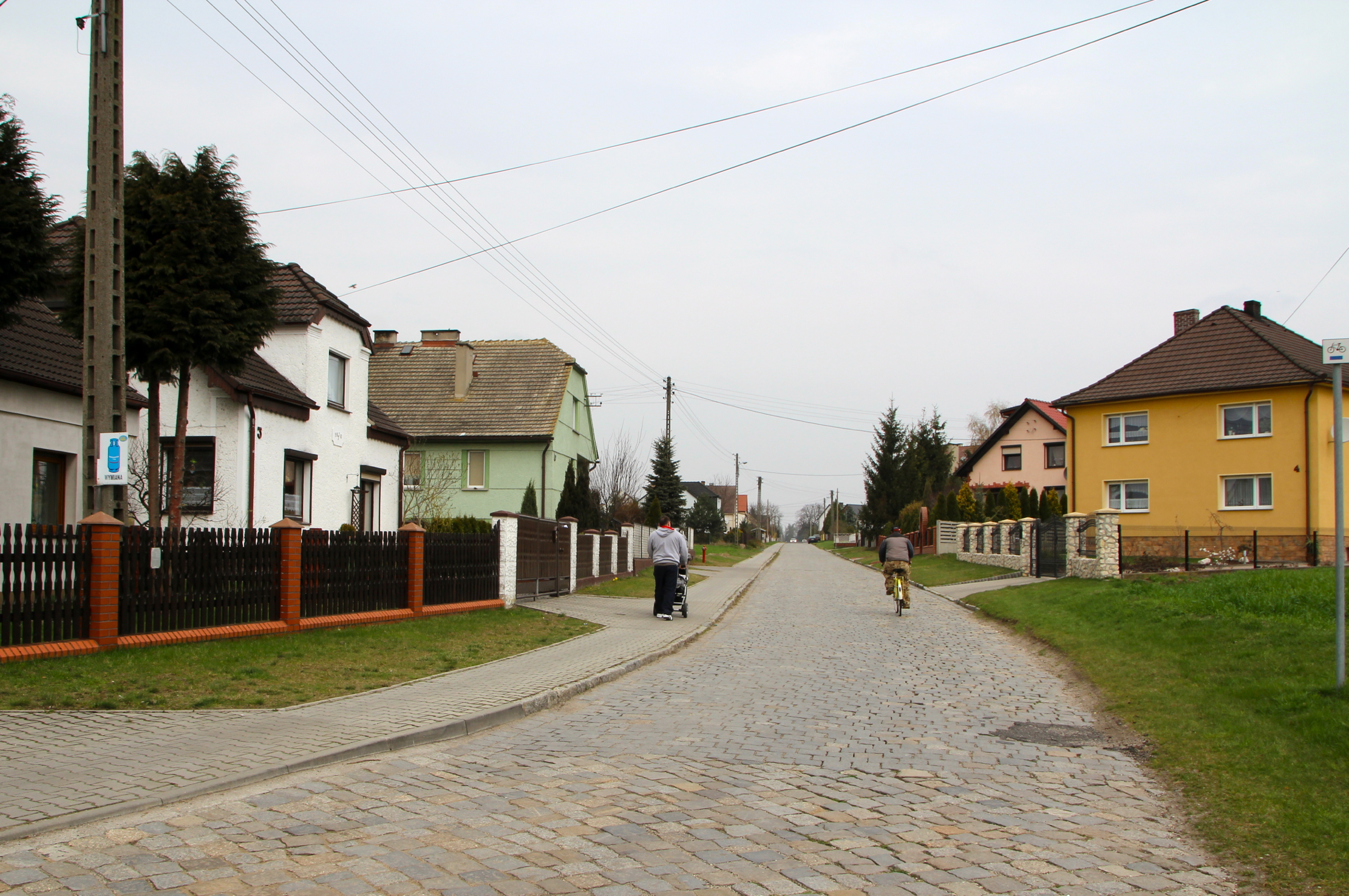

- Location within Poland
- Coordinates: 50°28′10″N 17°50′56″E
- Country: Poland
- Voivodeship: Opole
- County: Krapkowice
- Gmina: Strzeleczki

Zbychowice [zbɨxɔˈvit͡sɛ] (German: Karlshof-Seherrswald) is a village in the administrative district of Gmina Strzeleczki, within Krapkowice County, Opole Voivodeship, in south-western Poland.

== See also ==
- Prudnik Land
