= Kujawiak (disambiguation) =

Kujawiak is a Polish folk dance

Kujawiak may also refer to:

- person living at Kuyavia (Kujawy)
- person from Kuyavians ethnographic group
- ORP Kujawiak, Polish Navy ships
- Kujawiak (beer) (pl/de/nl), Polish beer from Bydgoszcz
- Kujawiak Astoria Bydgoszcz, basketball team from Bydgoszcz, Poland name in 1997-2000
- Kujawiak Kowal, football club from Kowal, Poland
- Kujawiak Włocławek, football and athletics club from Włocławek, Poland
- alias of Julian Marchlewski (1866–1925), Polish communist politician
- Kujawiak konspiracyjny/Kujawiak partyzancki, poem by Krystyna Krahelska
- Kujawiak in A minor (1853) and Kujawiak in C major by Henryk Wieniawski
- Kujawiak, Op. 31/2 by Felix Blumenfeld
- Kujawiak and Oberek for two xylophones and orchestra (1952) by Mieczysław Weinberg
