= Gmina Strzeleczki =

Gmina Strzeleczki Gemeinde Klein Strehlitz Strzeleczki Commune
- Gmina
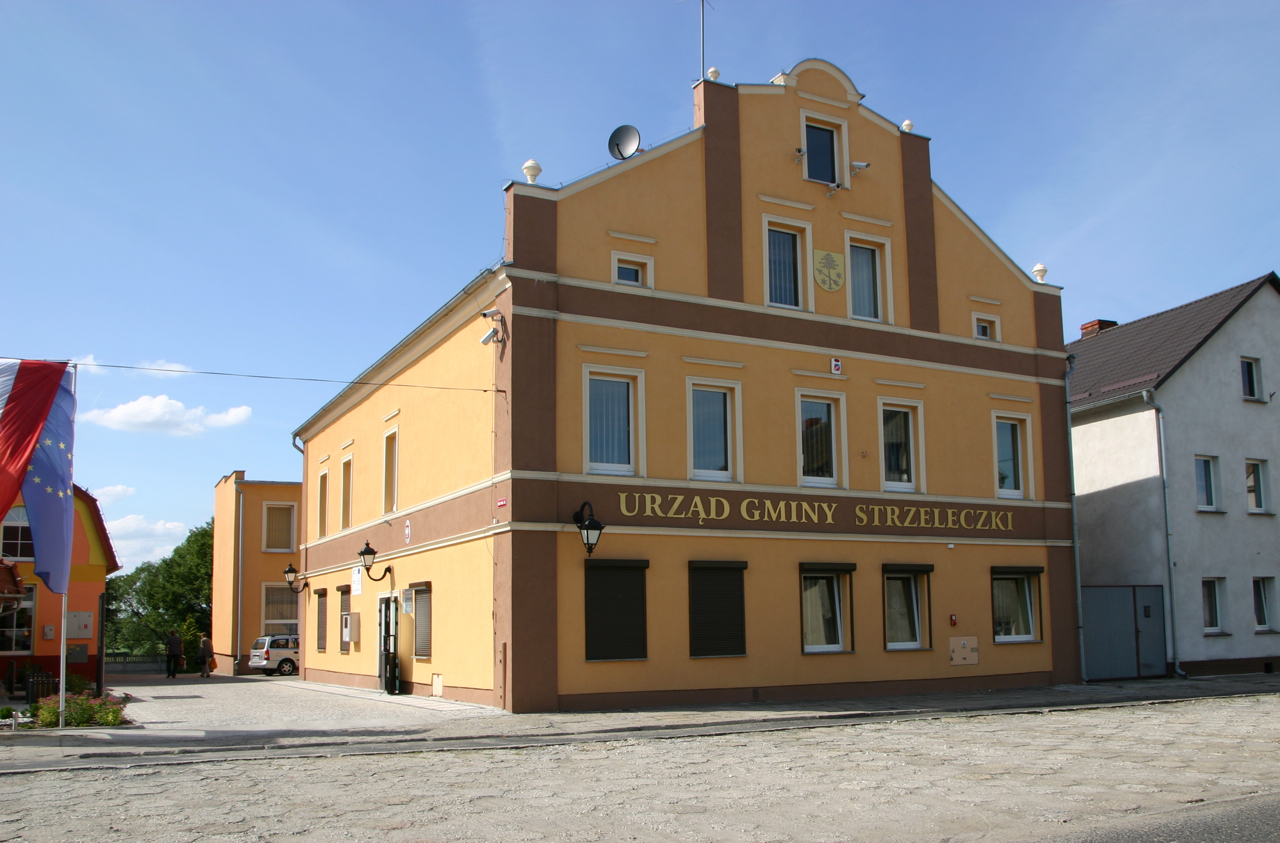
- Gmina office in Strzeleczki

- Flag Coat of arms
- Interactive map of Gmina Strzeleczki
- Coordinates (Strzeleczki): 50°28′N 17°52′E
- Country: Poland
- Voivodeship: Opole
- County: Krapkowice
- Seat: Strzeleczki

Area
  - Total: 117.26 km^{2} (45.27 sq mi)

Population (2019-06-30)
  - Total: 7,391
  - Density: 63.03/km^{2} (163.2/sq mi)
- Time zone: UTC+1 (CET)
  - Summer (DST): UTC+2 (CEST)
- Vehicle registration: OKR
- Website: http://www.strzeleczki.pl

Gmina Strzeleczki (German: Gemeinde Klein Strehlitz) is a rural gmina (administrative district) in Krapkowice County, Opole Voivodeship, in southern Poland. Its seat is the village of Strzeleczki, which lies approximately 8 kilometres (5 mi) west of Krapkowice and 23 km (14 mi) south of the regional capital Opole.

The gmina covers an area of 117.26 square kilometres (45.3 sq mi), and as of 2019, its total population was 7,391. Since 2006, the commune, like much of the surrounding area, has been bilingual in Polish and German.

== Administrative divisions ==
The commune contains the villages and settlements of:

- Strzeleczki
- Amerykan
- Buława
- Dobra
- Dziedzice
- Komorniki
- Kopalina
- Kujawy
- Łowkowice
- Moszna
- Nowy Bud
- Nowy Młyn
- Pisarzowice
- Racławiczki
- Ścigów
- Serwitut
- Smolarnia
- Urszulanowice
- Wawrzyńcowice
- Zbychowice
- Zielina

== Neighbouring gminas ==
Gmina Strzeleczki is bordered by the gminas of Biała, Głogówek, Gogolin, Krapkowice and Prószków.

== Twin towns – sister cities ==
Gmina Strzeleczki is twinned with:

- Bitburger Land, Germany
- Dvorce, Czech Republic
