= Kujawski =

Kujawski (femine: Kujawska) may refer to:

- coming from Kuyavia (Kujawy), Poland

== People ==
- Kazimierz I Kujawski (c. 1211–1267), Polish prince
- Maciej Kujawski (1953–2023), Polish actor
- Mariusz Kujawski (born 1986), Polish sprint canoer
- Peter Kujawski, American film studio executive

== Places ==
- Aleksandrów Kujawski
  - Gmina Aleksandrów Kujawski
  - Aleksandrów Kujawski internment camp
  - Aleksandrów Kujawski railway station
- Brześć Kujawski
  - Duchy of Brześć Kujawski, 1268–1320
  - Brześć Kujawski Voivodeship, 14th century–1793
  - Gmina Brześć Kujawski
- Dąbrówka Kujawska
- Izbica Kujawska
  - Gmina Izbica Kujawska
- Kępa Kujawska
- Lubień Kujawski
  - Gmina Lubień Kujawski
- Piotrków Kujawski
  - Gmina Piotrków Kujawski
- Solec Kujawski
  - Gmina Solec Kujawski
  - Solec Kujawski radio transmitter

== Events ==
- Peace of Brześć Kujawski, 1435, that ended the Polish–Teutonic War

== See also ==
- Podpiwek kujawski
- Gwara kujawska, Kuyavian dialect
- Piramidy kujawskie, Kuyavian Pyramids, enormous tombs, megalithic structures
- Kujawiak (disambiguation)
