= Markowice, Kuyavian-Pomeranian Voivodeship =

Markowice
- Village
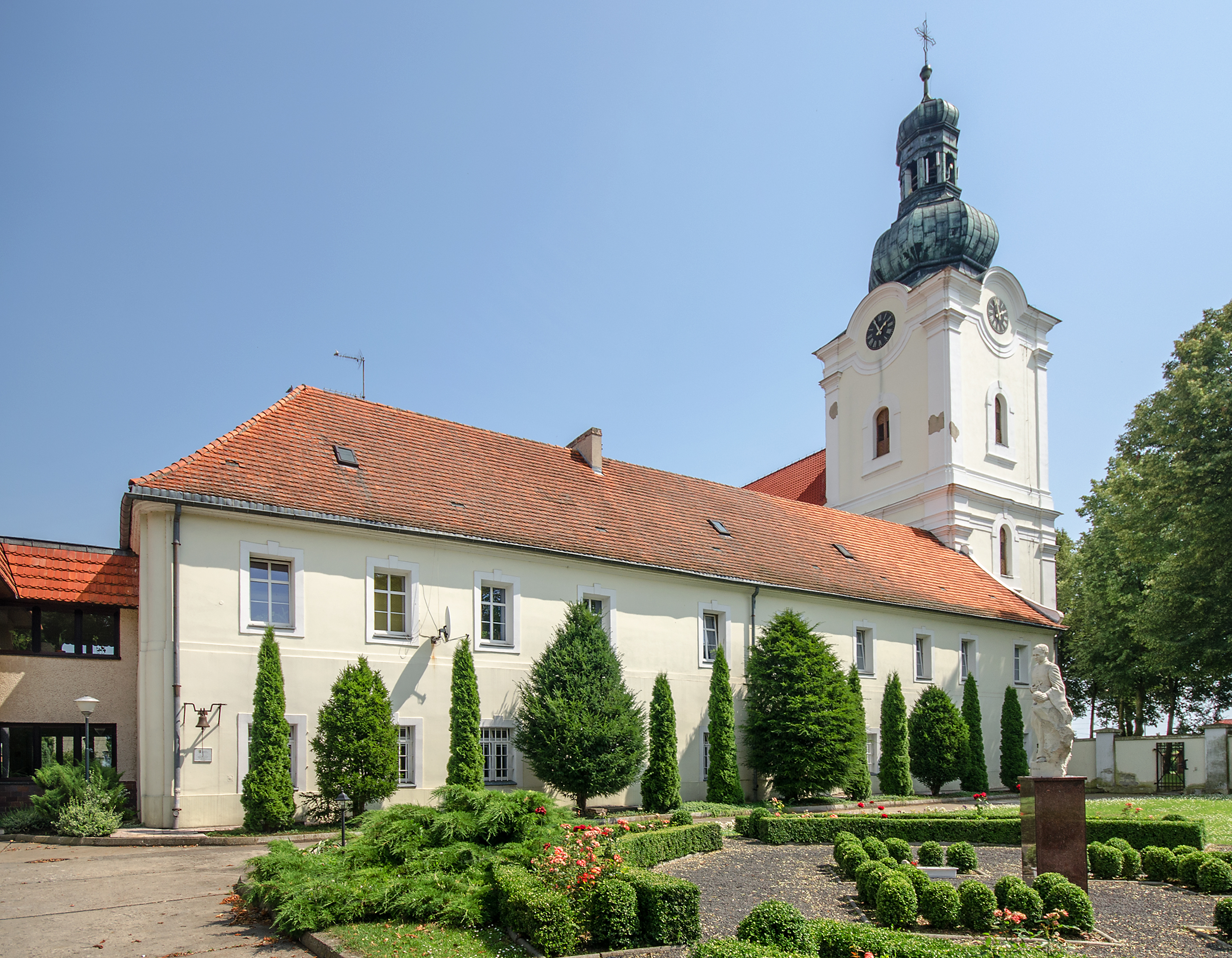
- Church of the Visitation in Markowice

- Location within Poland
- Coordinates: 52°42′N 18°13′E
- Country: Poland
- Voivodeship: Kuyavian-Pomeranian
- County: Mogilno
- Gmina: Strzelno
- First mentioned: 1215
- Time zone: UTC+1 (CET)
  - Summer (DST): UTC+2 (CEST)
- Vehicle registration: CMG

Markowice [markɔˈvit͡sɛ] is a village in the administrative district of Gmina Strzelno, within Mogilno County, Kuyavian-Pomeranian Voivodeship, in north-central Poland.

The landmark of Markowice is the Baroque monastery of the Oblates of Mary Immaculate, which features the Church of the Visitation.

== Sports ==
The local football club is Kujawy Markowice. It competes in the lower leagues.

== Notable people ==
- Gustaw Zieliński (1809–1881), poet, participant of the November Uprising, sybirak
- Ulrich von Wilamowitz-Moellendorff (1848–1931), classical philologist
