= Pisarzowice, Krapkowice County =

Pisarzowice Schreibersdorf
- Village
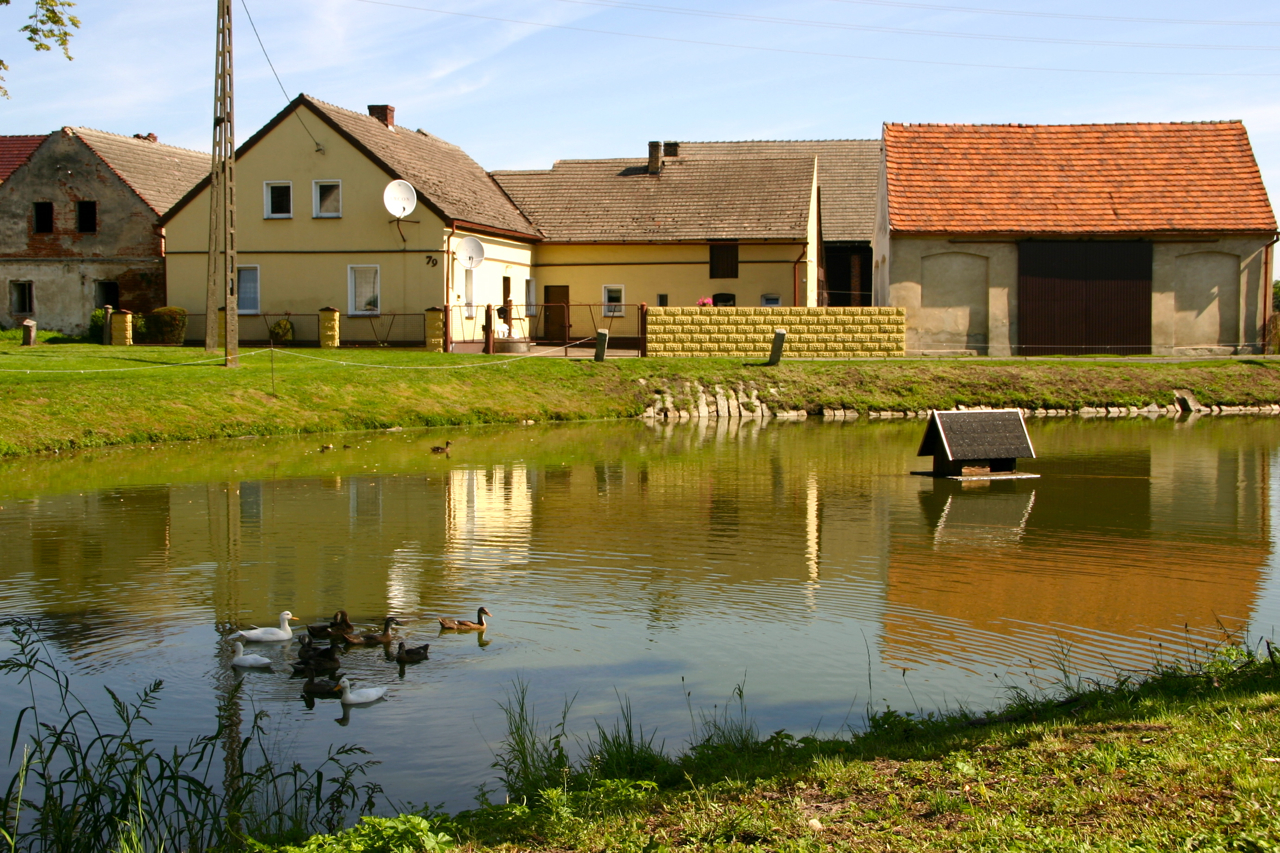

- Location within Poland
- Coordinates: 50°25′N 17°54′E
- Country: Poland
- Voivodeship: Opole
- County: Krapkowice
- Gmina: Strzeleczki
- Time zone: UTC+1 (CET)
  - Summer (DST): UTC+2 (CEST)
- Vehicle registration: OKR

Pisarzowice ([pisaʐɔˈvit͡sɛ], additional name in German: Schreibersdorf) is a village in the administrative district of Gmina Strzeleczki, within Krapkowice County, Opole Voivodeship, in southern Poland.

Since 2006 the village, like the rest of the commune, has been officially bilingual in Polish and German.

The nearby hamlet of Buława is administered jointly with this village.

== History ==
The village was first established in the Middle Ages. The name of the village was first recorded in 1285 as Villa Scriptoris, Latin for "Scribe's village", when it was part of Piast-ruled Poland. In 1383 its name was recorded by a traveller as Pisarcowice in Polish and Schreibersdorff in German. From 1428 the village belonged to the Cistercian monastery at Lubiąż. After a period of changing ownership, in 1646 it came under the control of the powerful Oppersdorff family of Oberglogau (Głogówek), who retained ownership of the village until the end of World War II.

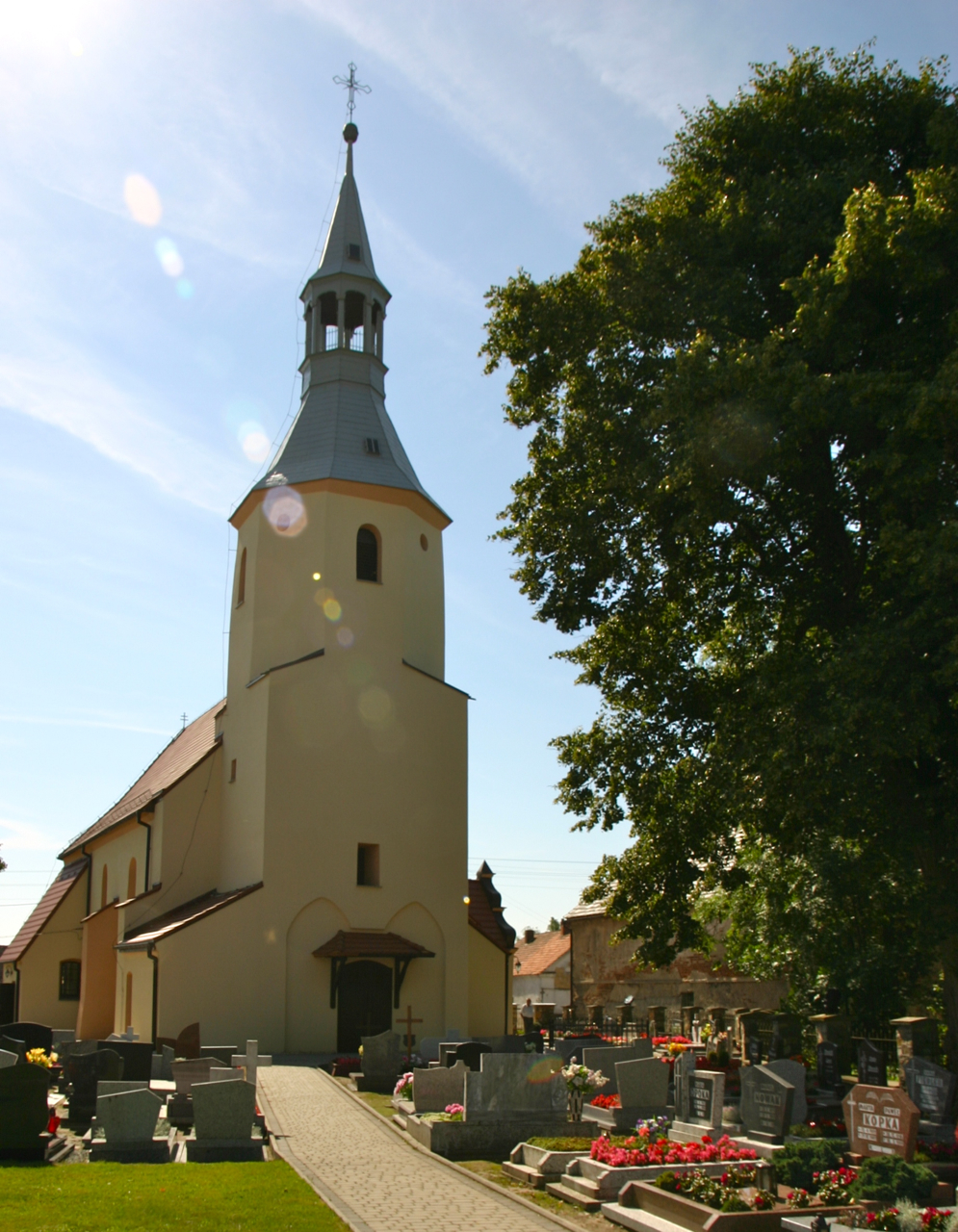
Saint Michael church

The parish church of St. Michael, originally known as the Church of St. Nicholas, was first built in the Middle Ages, and first mentioned in 1301. The church was enlarged around 1600, then renovated in 1784, 1858, and 1950. It has Renaissance and Silesian Baroque elements, and was built of brick and stone. The church has many historical objects of worship, including a 16th-century crucifix and a Baroque monstrance of the 17th century. In the church is the 1548 tombstone of local governor, Nicholas Lesoty, a work of Reinaissance design with a bas-relief stone knight. Around the church stretches a medieval stone wall. There is also a large manor house near the village, built in the mid-18th century in the late Baroque style for a local landowning family. It has a very impressive grand staircase and private chapel. It is currently private property.

In the 18th century the village passed to the Kingdom of Prussia, and in 1871 it became part of unified Germany, within which it belonged to the district of Landkreis Neustadt O.S. In the Upper Silesia plebiscite of 20 March 1921 419 villagers voted to remain with Germany and 76 voted to join the newly restored state of Poland. In the Dobrau Gutsbezirk, the local municipal council, 80 people voted for Germany and six for Poland. As a result, Dobrau remained in Germany. In 1933 the village had 628 inhabitants, but by 1939 its population had decreased to 583 people.

In 1945 the village became again part of Poland and the German population was largely expelled in accordance with the Potsdam Agreement, dramatically reducing the town's population; it has not since reached its former size. The village was renamed to its historic Polish name Pisarzowice. The village was administratively part of the Silesian Voivodeship. In 1950 it was reassigned to Opole Voivodeship, and in 1999 reassigned from Prudnik County to Krapkowice County. On 17 May 2006 the entire commune of Strzeleczki was declared bilingual in Polish and German, and on 24 November 2008 the old name German name Schreibersdorf was also made official.

== See also ==
- Prudnik Land
