= Kopalina, Krapkowice County =

Kopalina Kopaline
- Settlement
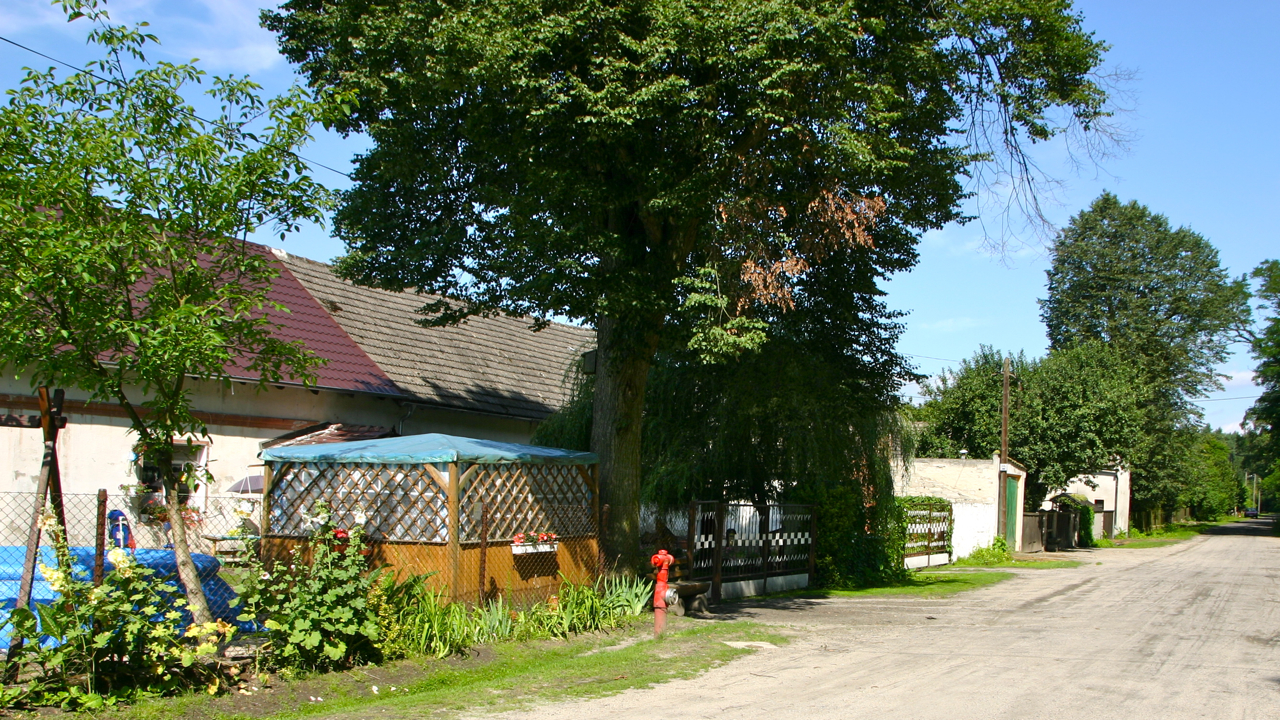

- Location within Poland
- Coordinates: 50°29′35″N 17°49′26″E
- Country: Poland
- Voivodeship: Opole
- County: Krapkowice
- Gmina: Strzeleczki
- Time zone: UTC+1 (CET)
  - Summer (DST): UTC+2 (CEST)
- Vehicle registration: OKR

Kopalina ([kɔpaˈlina], additional name in German: Kopaline) is a settlement in the administrative district of Gmina Strzeleczki, within Krapkowice County, Opole Voivodeship, in southern Poland.

== History ==
In the 10th century the area became part of the emerging Polish state, and later on, it was part of Poland, Bohemia (Czechia), Prussia, and Germany. In 1936, during a massive Nazi campaign of renaming of placenames, the village was renamed to Roding to erase traces of Polish origin. During World War II, the Germans operated the E195 forced labour subcamp of the Stalag VIII-B/344 prisoner-of-war camp in the village. After the defeat of Germany in the war, in 1945, the village became again part of Poland and its historic name was restored.

== See also ==
- Prudnik Land
