= Kujau =

Kujau may refer to:

- Konrad Kujau, a German illustrator and forger
- Kujawy, Opole Voivodeship, a village in Krapkowice County, Poland, formerly part of Germany
