= Dawid Kujawa (literary critic) =

Polish literary critic (born 1989)

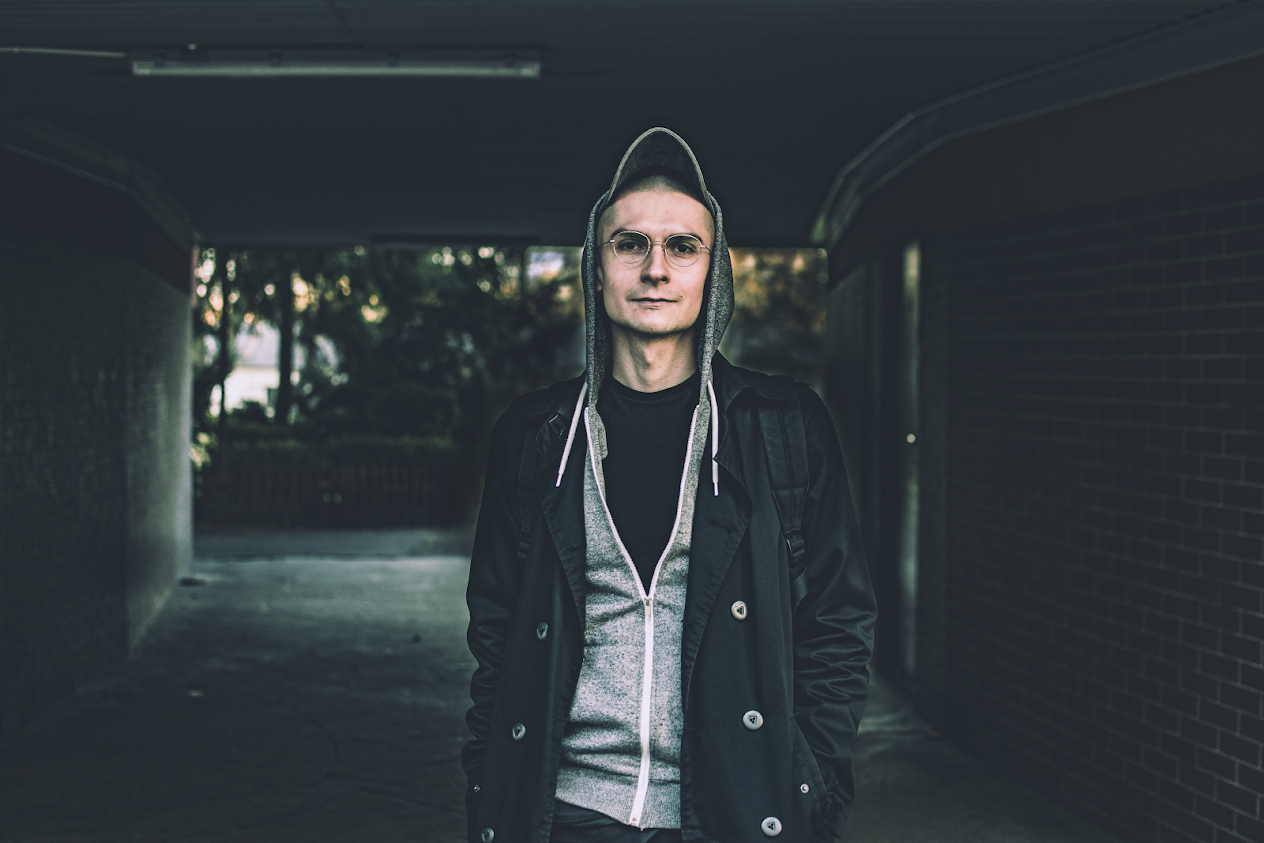
- Dawid Kujawa, 2018
- Born: 1989 (age 36–37)
- Occupation: Literary critic

Academic background
- Doctoral advisor: Alina Świeściak

Dawid Jan Kujawa (born 1989) is a literary critic, essayist and translator.

== Biography ==
Until 2017, he served as editor-in-chief of Opcje 1.1. magazine. Since 2016, he has been a regular contributor to the journal Praktyka Teoretyczna. Also in 2016, he was co-nominated for the Wrocław-based Warto Award.

His research interests include contemporary poetry, ontology of literary text and aesthetics, philosophy of Gilles Deleuze and Félix Guattari, heterodox Marxism, Italian radical political philosophy, and Baruch Spinoza.

In 2019 he obtained doctorate upon dissertation Powrót możliwego. Polska poezja po roku 2000 w perspektywie schizoanalizy supervised by Alina Świeściak.

== Books ==
- Wideopoezja. Szkice o zjawisku. Katowice: Stowarzyszenie Inicjatyw Wydawniczych. 2014.
- Pocałunki ludu. Poezja i krytyka po roku 2000. Kraków: Korporacja Ha!art. 2021.
- Niedzielne ziemie. Poezja i dobra wspólne. Warszawa: Convivo. 2024.
- W myśl praw geometrii. Jak lewica przestała się martwić i pokochała logikę towarową. Warszawa: Wydawnictwo Filtry. 2025.

=== Translations ===
- Tate, James. Czcigodna kompania wytwórców strzał. Ossolineum. Translated together with Rafał Wawrzyńczyk.
