= Dziedzice, Krapkowice County =

Dziedzice Sedschütz
- Village
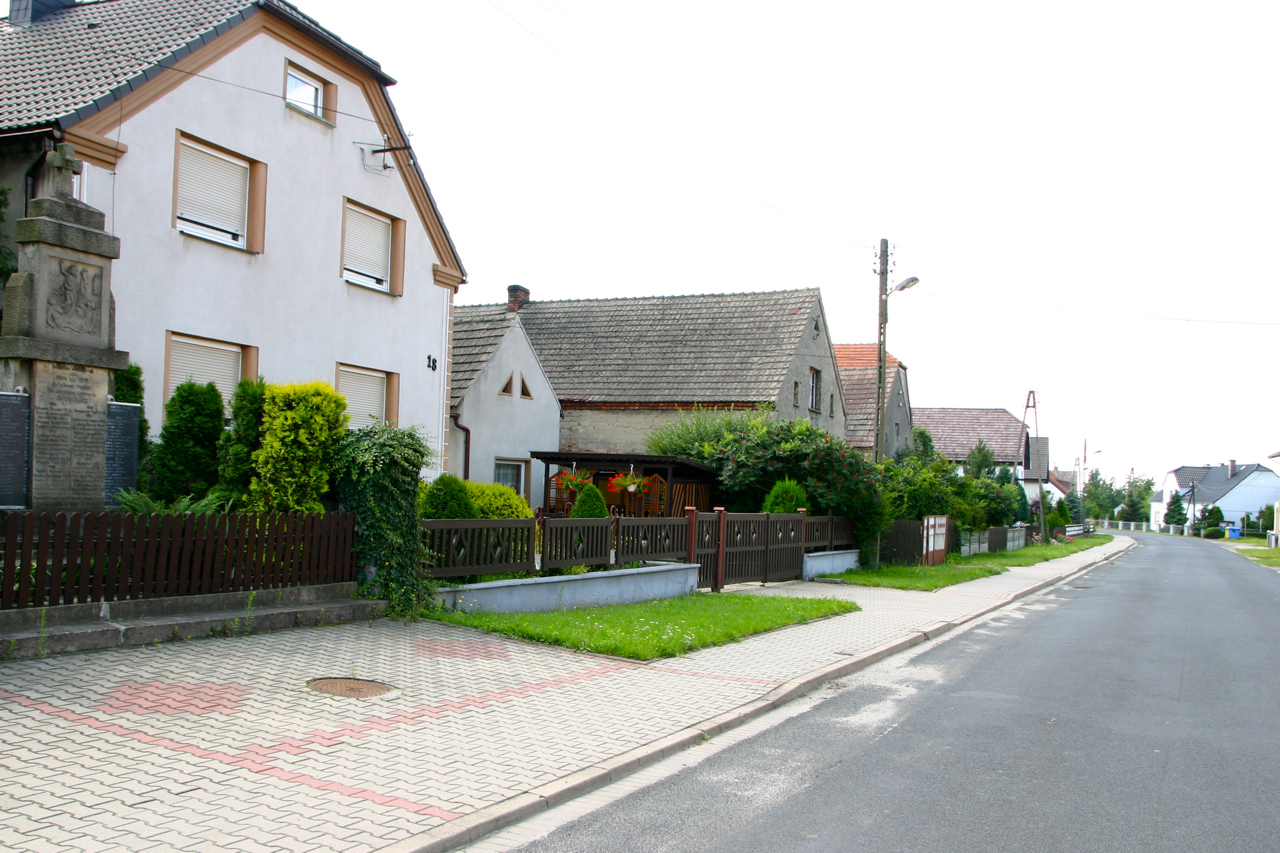

- Location within Poland
- Coordinates: 50°29′N 17°47′E
- Country: Poland
- Voivodeship: Opole
- County: Krapkowice
- Gmina: Strzeleczki
- Population: 450
- Time zone: UTC+1 (CET)
  - Summer (DST): UTC+2 (CEST)
- Vehicle registration: OKR

Dziedzice ([d͡ʑɛˈd͡ʑit͡sɛ], additional name in German: Sedschütz) is a village in the administrative district of Gmina Strzeleczki, within Krapkowice County, Opole Voivodeship, in southern Poland.

== History ==
The settlement dates back to the Early Middle Ages, to the 5th or 8th century, and in the 10th century it became part of the emerging Polish state. Within medieval Piast-ruled Poland, it was the location of a motte-and-bailey castle, which existed until the 15th century, and is now an archaeological site.

It was first mentioned in 1531, and its name is believed to derive from the name of its founder.

In 1783 the town was bought by King Frederick the Great of Prussia. From 1871 it was also part of Germany.

In 1921 the Upper Silesia plebiscite on 20 March 1921, 862 votes were cast, with 541 villagers voting to remain with Germany, and 321 voting to join the newly restored state of Poland. The village became again part of Poland following Germany's defeat in World War II in 1945.

== See also ==
- Prudnik Land
