= Nowy Młyn, Opole Voivodeship =

Nowy Młyn Neumühle
- Village
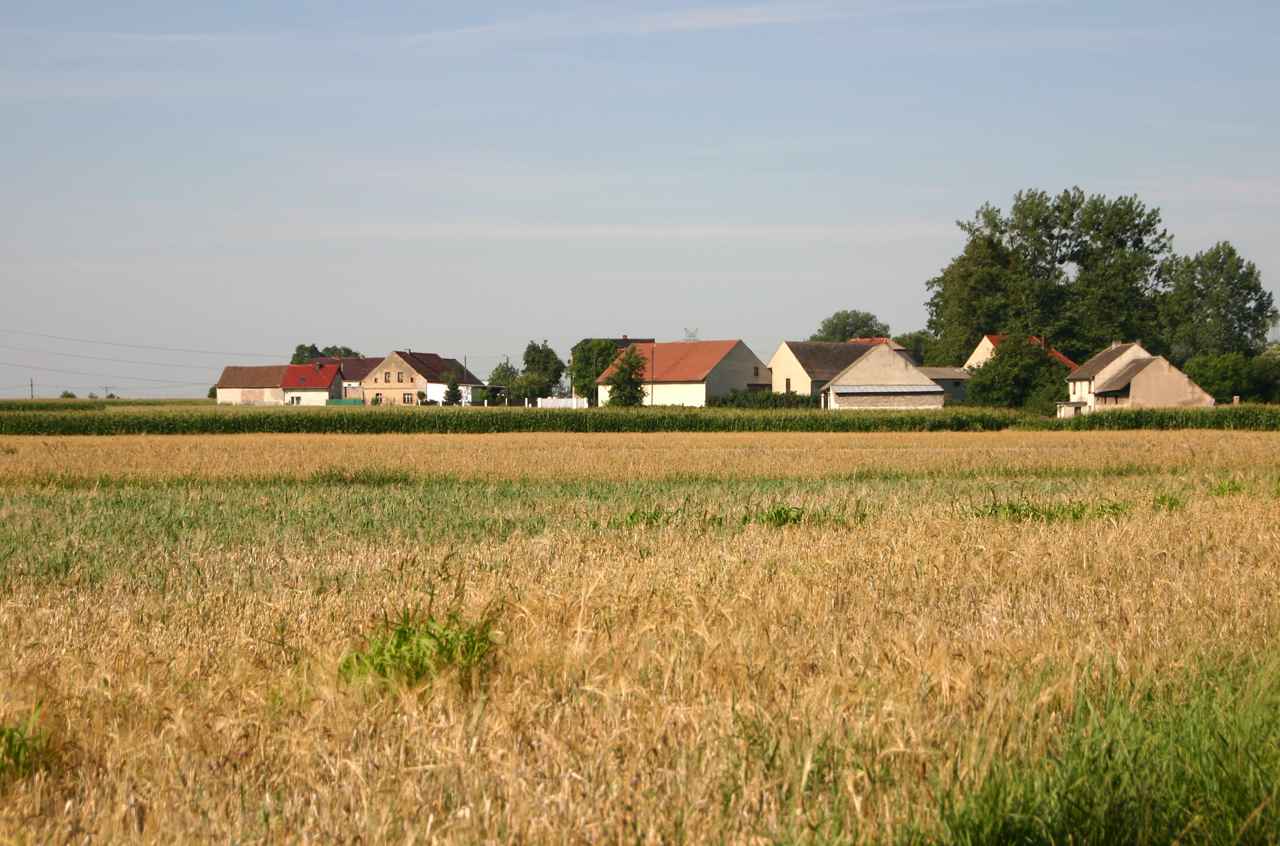

- Location within Poland
- Coordinates: 50°26′45″N 17°56′1″E
- Country: Poland
- Voivodeship: Opole
- County: Krapkowice
- Gmina: Strzeleczki
- Time zone: UTC+1 (CET)
  - Summer (DST): UTC+2 (CEST)
- Vehicle registration: OKR

Nowy Młyn ([ˈnɔvɨ ˈmwɨn], additional name in German: Neumühle) is a hamlet in the administrative district of Gmina Strzeleczki, within Krapkowice County, Opole Voivodeship, in southern Poland.

The village is administered as part of the village of Komorniki.

Since 2006 the village, along with the entire commune, has been bilingual in Polish and German.

== History ==
The village's name was first recorded in 1783, when there were 26 people living there. It comes from the mill that was located in the village ("Neumühle" and "Nowy Młyn" both meaning "new mill").

== See also ==
- Prudnik Land
