= ORP Kujawiak =

ORP Kujawiak has been the name of three ships of the Polish Navy:

- ORP Kujawiak (1921), a torpedo boat
- ORP Kujawiak (1955), a submarine, former soviet M-245.
- ORP Kujawiak (L72), a destroyer escort
