= Kujawy, Opole Voivodeship =

Kujawy Kujau
- Village
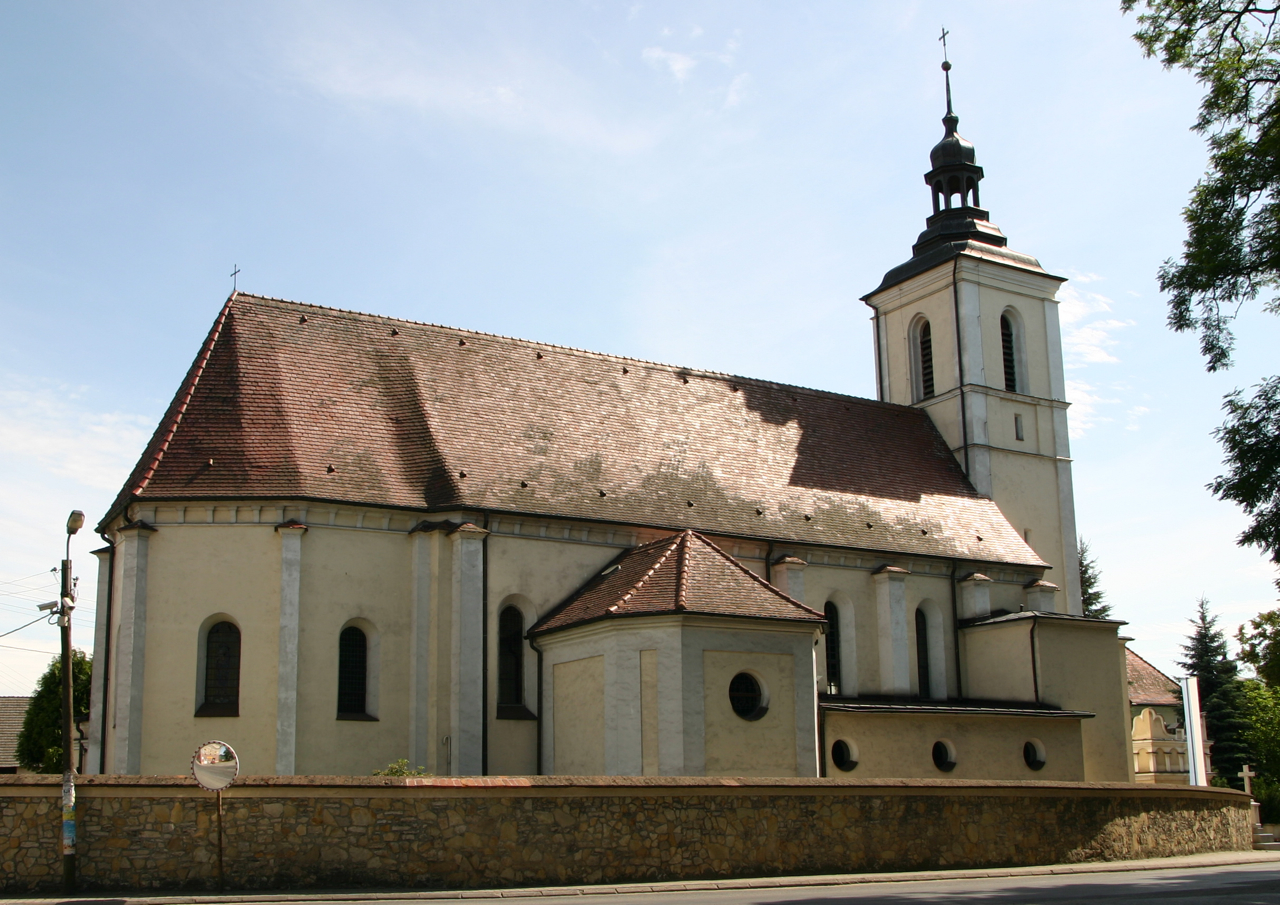
- Holy Trinity church

- Location within Poland
- Coordinates: 50°26′35″N 17°48′21″E
- Country: Poland
- Voivodeship: Opole
- County: Krapkowice
- Gmina: Strzeleczki

Population
  - Total: 700
- Time zone: UTC+1 (CET)
  - Summer (DST): UTC+2 (CEST)
- Vehicle registration: OKR

Kujawy ([kuˈjavɨ], additional name in German: Kujau) is a village in the administrative district of Gmina Strzeleczki, within Krapkowice County, Opole Voivodeship, in southern Poland.

Since 2006 the village, like the entire commune, has been bilingual in Polish and German.

== History ==
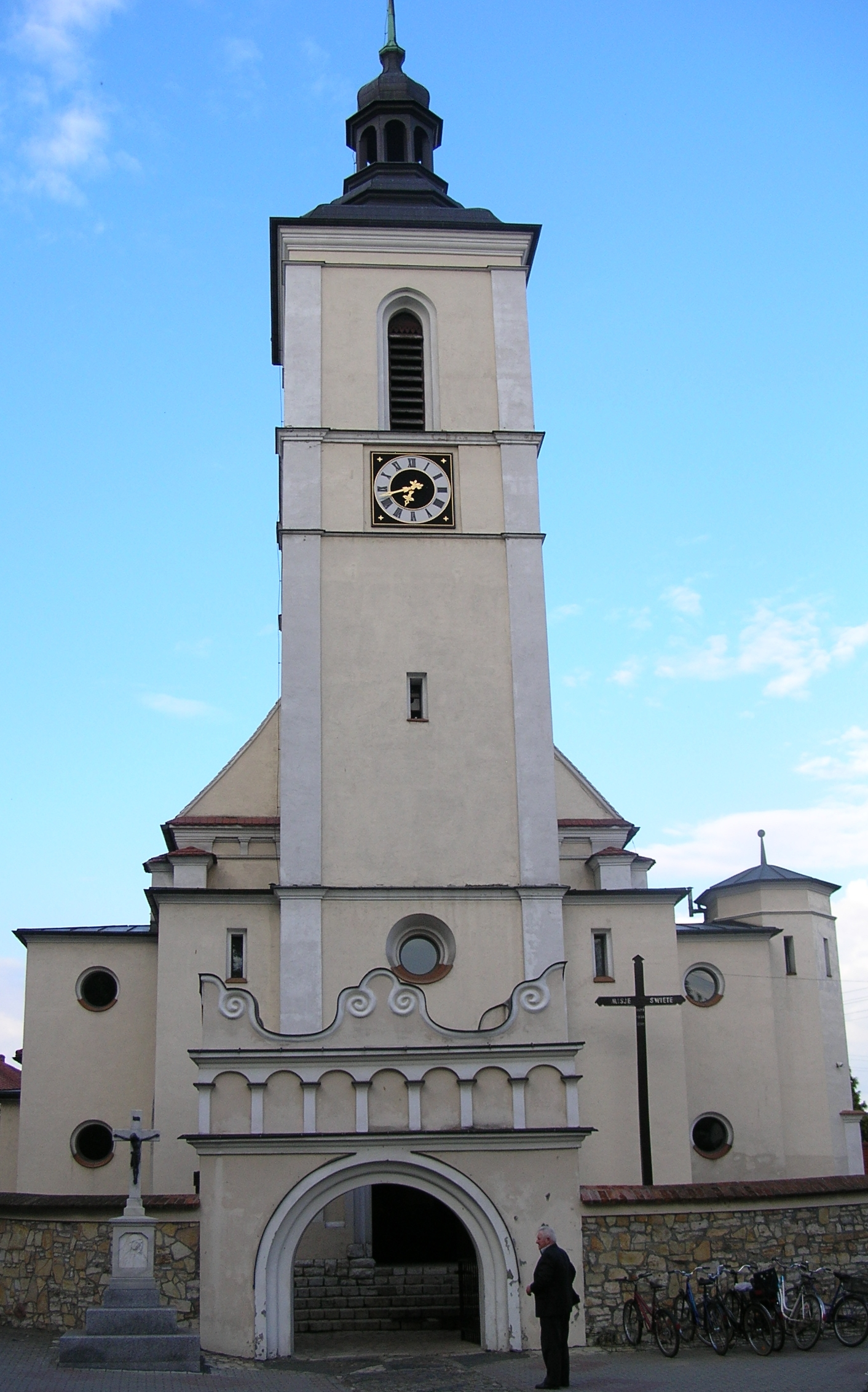
Catholic Church

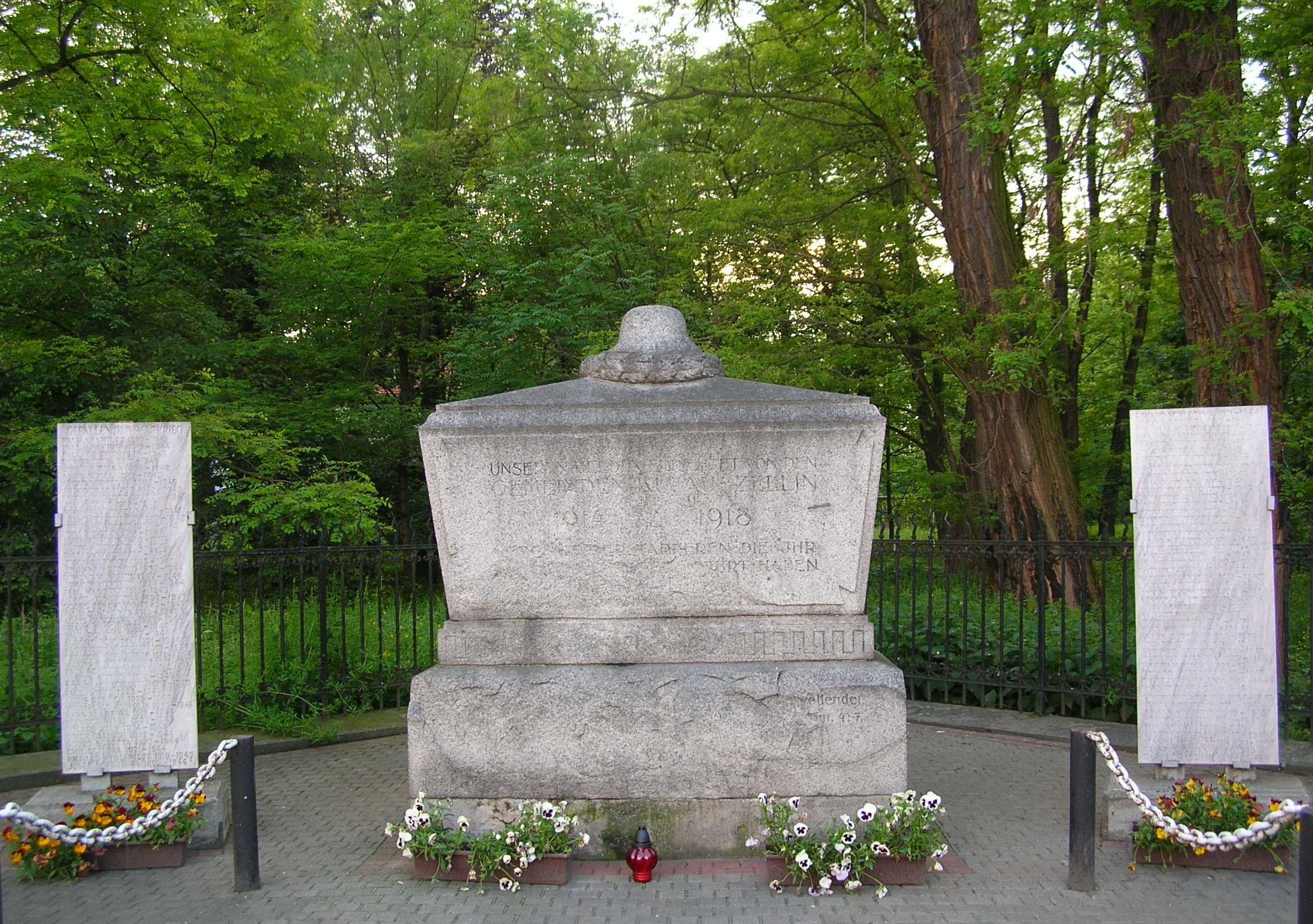
World War I Memorial

The first mention of the village dates to 1383, when the Piast Prince Ladislaus II titled himself as Duke of Opole, Prudnik, Dobra, and Kujawy. The name of the village also appears in a tithing register in 1447.

A parish was founded in Kujawy in the 14th century, when the original church, probably made of wood, was built. The current Church of the Holy Trinity dates to the sixteenth century, and was built in a Renaissance style. The new church was built out of stone and plaster. After the expansion it took the form of a three-name, basilica type church. The church contains many late Renaissance wall paintings, and on the vault are two angels with an Arma Christi display. The church has a wooden, late Baroque altar from the second half of the 18th century, and a Renaissance pulpit from the 16th. In the temple are many historic liturgical objects and bronze candlesticks. The church also has an historic register of marriages, with the oldest records dating to the sixteenth century and made in Polish and German. There is also a palace and park near the town, formerly belonging to an old, landowning family, which were built in the late 19th and early 20th centuries and are now privately own.

In the 18th century, the village was annexed by Prussia, within which it belonged to the district of Landkreis Neustadt O.S.

In 1945 the village became again part of Poland and the German population was largely expelled in accordance with the Potsdam Agreement. The village was administratively part of the Silesian Voivodeship. In 1950 it was reassigned to Opole Voivodeship, and in 1999 reassigned from Prudnik County to Krapkowice County. On 17 May 2006 the entire commune of Strzeleczki was declared bilingual in Polish and German, and on 24 November 2008 the old name German name Kujau was also made official.

There is a memorial in the town to honor all the soldiers from Kujau who fought for Germany in World War I.

== See also ==
- Prudnik Land
