= Kujawy Markowice =

Polish football club

- Full name: Ludowy Zespół Sportowy Kujawy Markowice
- Founded: October 6, 1949
- Ground: Markowice, Poland
- Manager: Benedykt Szostkiewicz
- League: Liga Okręgowa Cuiavian-Pomeranian Group 2
- 2024/5: 15th of 16
- Website: LZS Kujawy Markowice on Facebook
Home colours	Away colours

Ludowy Zespół Sportowy Kujawy Markowice is a football club from Markowice, Poland.. As of the 2025/6 season they play in the Klasa B.
