= Buława, Opole Voivodeship =

Buława Buhlau
- Village
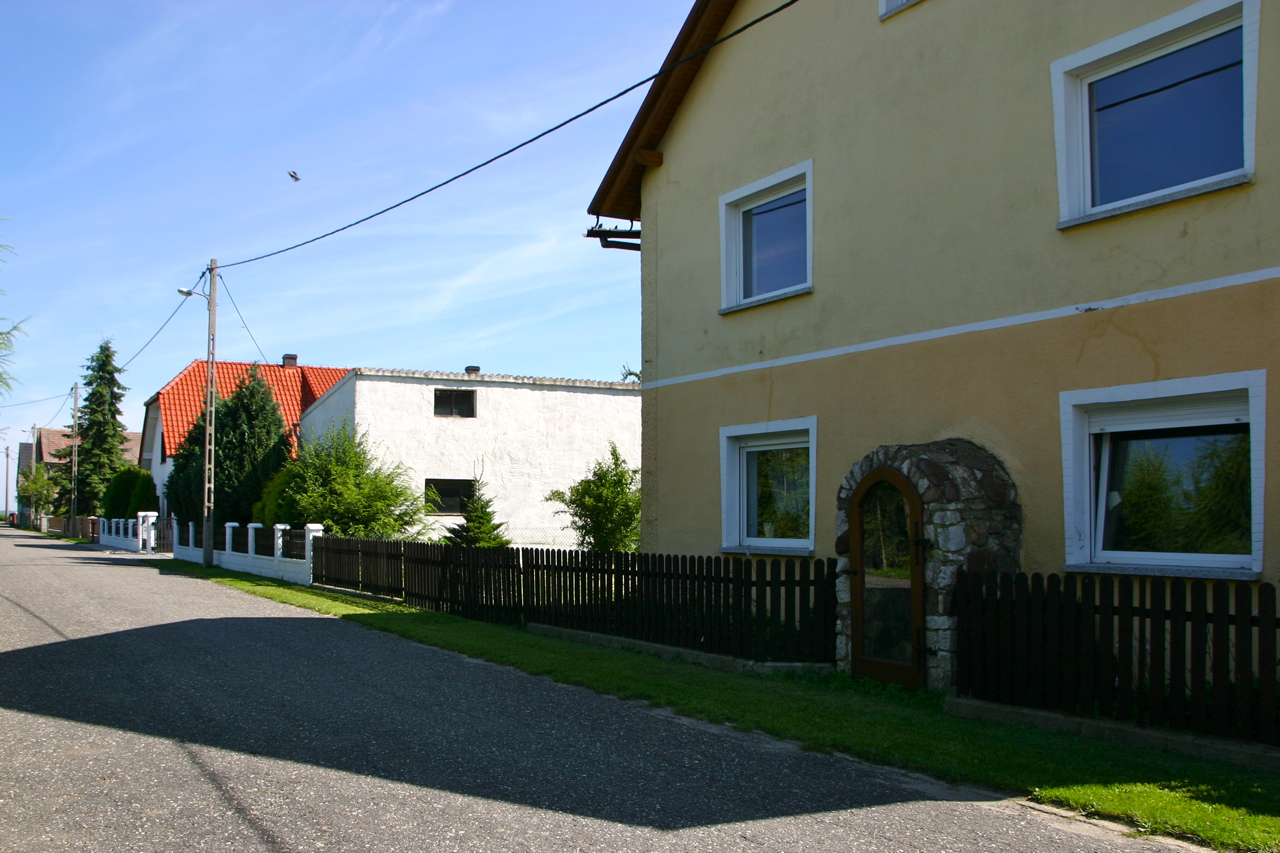

- Location within Poland
- Coordinates: 50°25′30″N 17°50′32″E
- Country: Poland
- Voivodeship: Opole
- County: Krapkowice
- Gmina: Strzeleczki

Population
  - Total: 120
- Time zone: UTC+1 (CET)
  - Summer (DST): UTC+2 (CEST)
- Vehicle registration: OKR

Buława ([buˈwava], additional name in German: Buhlau) is a village in the administrative district of Gmina Strzeleczki, within Krapkowice County, Opole Voivodeship, in the southern region of Upper Silesia in Poland.

The village is administered as part of the village of Pisarzowice.

== See also ==
- Prudnik Land
