= Serwitut, Opole Voivodeship =

Serwitut Servitut
- Village
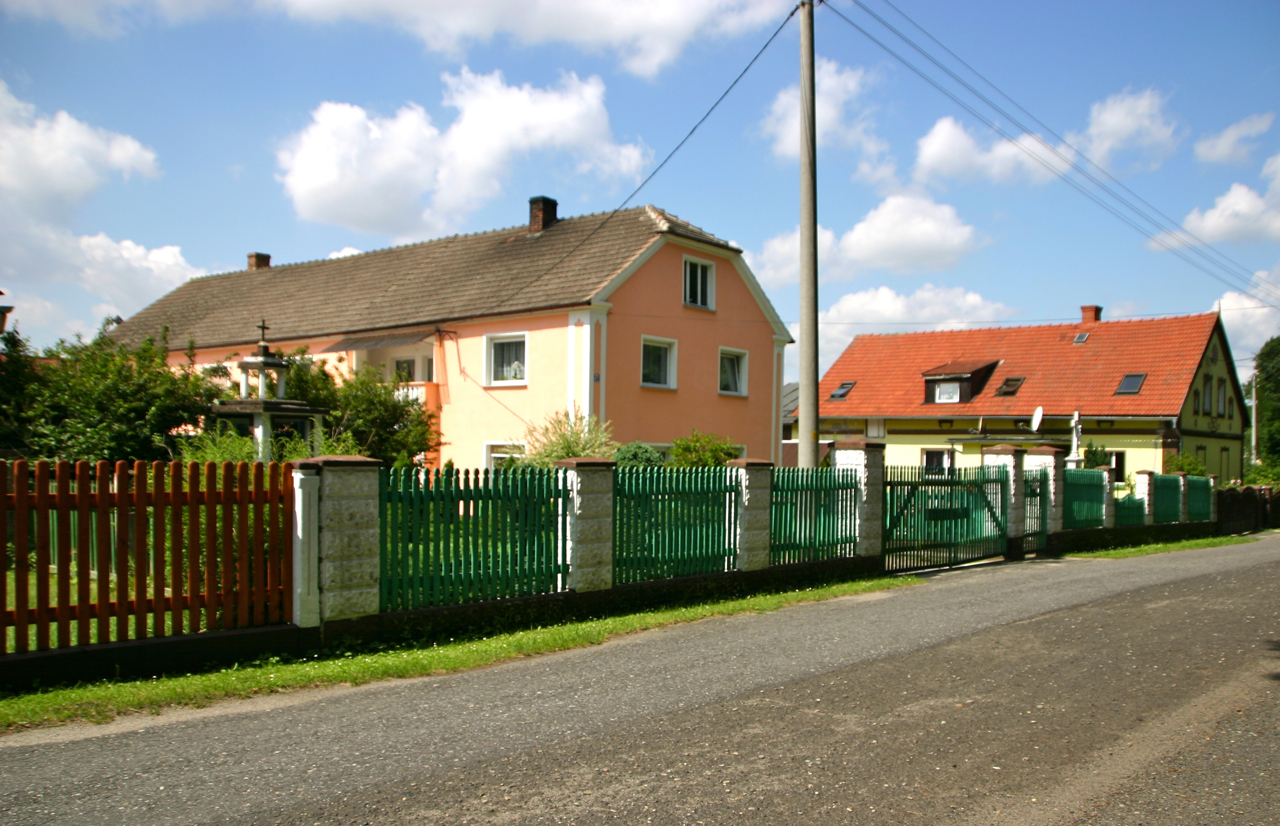

- Location within Poland
- Coordinates: 50°29′25″N 17°47′48″E
- Country: Poland
- Voivodeship: Opole
- County: Krapkowice
- Gmina: Strzeleczki
- Time zone: UTC+1 (CET)
  - Summer (DST): UTC+2 (CEST)
- Vehicle registration: OKR

Serwitut ([sɛrˈvitut], additional name in German: Servitut) is a village in the administrative district of Gmina Strzeleczki, within Krapkowice County, Opole Voivodeship, in southern Poland.

== See also ==
- Prudnik Land
