= Racławiczki =

Racławiczki Rasselwitz
- Village
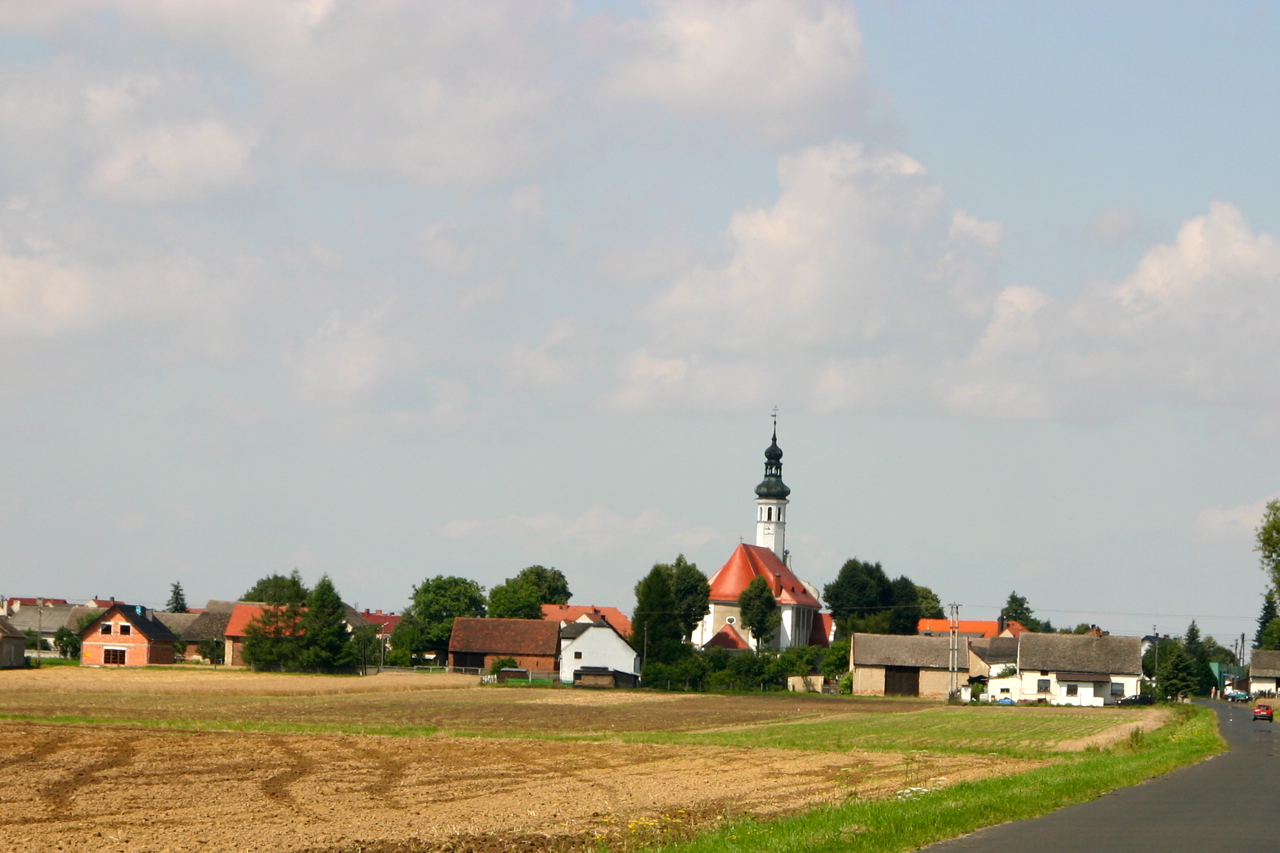

- Location within Poland
- Coordinates: 50°28′N 17°47′E
- Country: Poland
- Voivodeship: Opole
- County: Krapkowice
- Gmina: Strzeleczki

Population (approx.)
  - Total: 876
- Time zone: UTC+1 (CET)
  - Summer (DST): UTC+2 (CEST)
- Vehicle registration: OKR
- Website: http://www.osp-raclawiczki.blo.pl

Racławiczki ([rat͡swaˈvit͡ʂki], additional name in German: Rasselwitz) is a village in the administrative district of Gmina Strzeleczki, within Krapkowice County, Opole Voivodeship, in southern Poland.

== See also ==
- Prudnik Land
