= Landkreis Neustadt O.S. =

Prussian district in Upper Silesia from 1743 to 1945

- District of Prussia
- 1743–1945
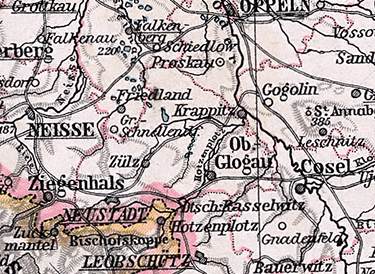
- Map from 1905
- Capital: Neustadt O.S. (Prudnik)
- History
  - Established: 1743
  - Disestablished: 1945
- Today part of: Poland

The Neustadt O.S. district was a Prussian district in Upper Silesia from 1743 to 1945. Its capital was the city of Neustadt (Prudnik). Its territory corresponded roughly to the present-day Prudnik County in the Opole Voivodeship in Poland.

== History ==
After the conquest of most of Silesia, King Frederick the Great introduced Prussian administrative structures in Lower Silesia in 1742 and in Upper Silesia in 1743. This included the establishment of two war and domain chambers in Breslau (Wrocław) and Glogau (Głogów) as well as their division into districts. The district of Neustadt was initially under the War and Domain Chamber of Breslau. In the course of the Prussian Reform Movement, the administrative region of Oppeln was created in the Province of Silesia, which included the Neustadt district.

During the district reform of January 1, 1818, the district boundaries were changed as follows:

- The villages of Berndau, Damasko, Gläsen, Kasimir, Schönau, Steubendorf and Thomnitz were transferred from the Neustadt district to the Leobschütz district.
- The villages of Oberwitz and Roswadze were transferred from the Neustadt district to the Groß Strehlitz district.
- The villages of Dobersdorf and Malckwitz were transferred from the Oppeln district to the Neustadt district.

From 1871, the district belonged to the German Empire. The indigenous Polish population was subjected to Germanisation policies. On November 8, 1919, the province of Silesia was dissolved and the new province of Upper Silesia was formed from Regierungsbezirk Oppeln. In the Upper Silesia plebiscite held on March 20, 1921, 88.2% of voters in the Neustadt district voted for Germany and 11.8% voted for Poland. Therefore, the district remained in Germany. The district capital was mentioned as one of the main centers of the Polish movement in the Province of Upper Silesia in a secret Sicherheitsdienst report from 1934. The persecution of Poles intensified since 1937.

During the German invasion of Poland, which started World War II in September 1939, Gestapo carried out mass arrests of Polish activists and closed and seized the funds of Polish banks. The arrested Poles were deported to concentration camps. In the following years, the Germans established several forced labour camps in the district, including a subcamp of the Auschwitz concentration camp and the E600 subcamp of the Stalag VIII-B/344 prisoner-of-war camp. In January 1945, the prisoners of the subcamp of Auschwitz were evacuated by the Germans to the Gross-Rosen concentration camp in a death march, and death marches of thousands of prisoners of several other subcamps of Auschwitz passed through the district.

After World War II, the district became part of Poland under the terms of the Potsdam Agreement.

== Demographics ==
According to the Prussian census of 1840, the district had a population of 68,677, of which 35,476 (51.7%) were Germans and 33,201 (48.3%) were Poles.
