= Kórnica Uprising =

1945 rebellion of Germans and Silesians against Polish authorities

| Date | 9–10 July 1945 |
| Location | Kórnica, Prudnik County, Poland 50°24′09″N 17°54′26″E |
| Result | Arrest and persecution of insurgents |

Belligerents
| (Germany) (Upper Silesia) Residents of Kórnica | (Poland) Militiamen of Kórnica and Prudnik and soldiers of Prudnik |

Commanders and leaders
| Flora Sacher; Hedwiga Sluzallek | Kazimierz Wrona (MO Prudnik) |

Strength
| 50–200 | 10 militiamen from Kórnica, 30 militiamen and soldiers from Prudnik |

Casualties and losses
| 1 injured | 10 injured |

The Kórnica Uprising (Polish: powstanie kórnickie, German: Körnitzer Aufstand) was a rebellion of Germans and Silesians of the village of Kórnica, then in Prudnik County, against the Polish authorities, in July 1945.

== Background ==
The Soviet Red Army entered Kórnica (then Körnitz in Nazi Germany) on its way to Prudnik during the Upper Silesian offensive on 19 March 1945. A funeral of one of the oldest residents of the village, 83-year-old Joseph Moriz, took place on that day, received by the local population as a sign of "the end of the German era". After the village was captured, waves of theft, rape, and deportations started. Soviets shot five women who defended themselves from being raped, and one soldier, while juggling a grenade, killed himself along with six children in the courtyard of Kasperek family's house.

People who remained in Kórnica were mostly women, the elderly, children, and the war-disabled. Several Wehrmacht soldiers, who returned home from war or escaped from Soviet captivity, were hiding in the village. One of the young men left in the village was a Pole named Władysław, who arrived in Kórnica for forced labour and decided to remain here because he felt well-treated by the local people. The villagers believed that Americans will not let Silesia be annexed into the Soviet sphere of influence.

From March to May 1945, Prudnik County was controlled by the Soviet military commandant's office. Following the capitulation of the German state, it was passed on to the Polish administration on 11 May 1945. The administration of the village of Kórnica was taken over by the Citizens' Militia (Milicja Obywatelska, MO). Nine militiamen were quartered outside of the village's centre, in a house belonging to Anton Kroll, a farmer who has not yet returned home from war. From that house, they could observe movement on the road from Głogówek to Krapkowice. The house's occupants were forced to move to the attic. The Polish authorities considered the people of Kórnica to be "Germanised Poles". The Militia provided the residents with safety and protection against the Red Army's robberies. Soon, however, the militiamen began to search houses, confiscate property, harass and humiliate civilians who spoke German, and deport men returning home from the war. They set up a prison in the basement of the Kroll family's barn. Residents continued to be robbed by groups of looters from outside Silesia and by the Red Army soldiers quartered in neighboring localities. The atmosphere in the village was tense.

== Uprising ==
At noon on 9 July 1945, several men with a wagon arrived in Kórnica, intending to steal the villager's remaining possessions. They attempted to seize Paul Hupka's horse, the last remaining horse in the village. Franz Kusiek, a one-armed war invalid, came to Hupka's aid, along with Franz Sacher, who had been in hidiing until then, and Hans Frost, the son of a local teacher. A scuffle broke out between the looters and the villagers. One of the residents called the Militia for help. Upon arrival, the militiamen did not engage the thieves, but Sacher and Kusiek. The outraged villages began calling the militiamen "occupiers" and "partitioners", for which they were then called "szwaby" (Polish equivalent of "Kraut") and "Hitlerites". The looters fled during the brawl. The militiamen called in armed reinforcements and arrested Kusiek and Sacher, taking them to the prison in Kroll's barn.

Angered residents of Kórnica rushed toward the Militia station. Flora Sacher (sister of the arrested Franz) and Hedwig Sluzallek led the crowd of about 50 people, consisting primarily of women and a few men (including a Pole, Władysław). Several women entered the building to free the detainees. Villagers attacked the Polish militiamen with wooden beams and pickets ripped from fences. One militiaman fired a pistol but was subdued. After Kusiek was freed, he wanted to kill a wounded militiaman with an axe, but Sluzallek stopped him. The beaten militiamen began to flee towards Głogówek. In that moment, a truck stopped in front of the Kroll farm, and heavily armed Red Army soldiers emerged from it. Seeing the beaten militiamen lying on the ground, the Soviets burst into laughter, went back into the truck, and rove away, shouting words of encouragement (davai, davai) towards the villagers.

The villagers found and destroyed crates of rifles and ammunition at the Militia station. An elderly man threw a Polish flag hanging in the building's window into the ground, and the crowd tore it to shreds. The people of Kórnica were filled with euphoria. Vincent Nowak, the local churchwarden, ran around the village shouting in Silesian: "Ôni już sam niy przidōm, ci se sam już wianci niy pokŏrzōm!" ("They will not come here again, they will not show themselves here again!). Some residents, fearing Poles' revenge, hid in tall grain in nearby fields and in neighboring villages.

The county commander of the Citizens' Militia in Prudnik, second lieutenant Kazimierz Wrona, described the events in Kórnica in a special report:

Dnia 10 lipca otrzymałem zameldowanie od komendanta posterunku MO w Kórnicy (Kornitz) plutonowego Gawrona Maksymiliana następującej treści: Wczoraj o godz. 13 ludność niemiecka w Kórnicy w liczbie około 200 napadła na nasz posterunek, znajdujących się milicjantów rozbroiła, a następnie pobiła tak mocno, że paru odniosło krwawe rany.
On 10 July, I received a report from the commander of the Militia station in Kórnica (Kornitz), platoon-leader Gawron Maksymilian, with the following content: Yesterday at 13, the German population of Kórnica, numbering about 200, attacked our station, disarmed the militiamen, and then beat them so severely that some of them suffered bloody wounds.

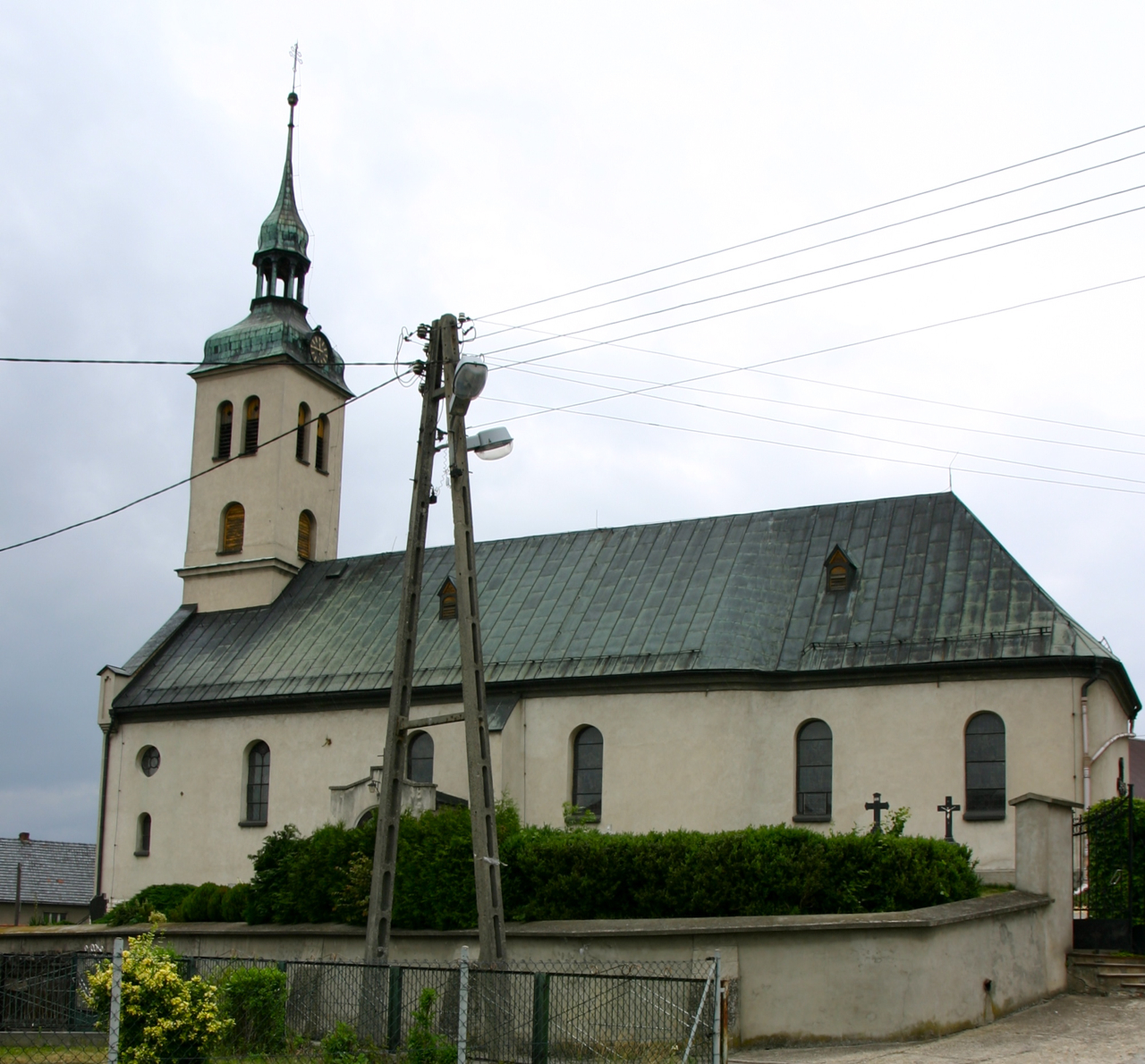
Church in Kórnica

On 10 July, a 30-man heavily armed unit of militia and Polish soldiers from Prudnik arrived in Kórnica. The Poles searched every house in the village. They threatened the Germans, held in the yeard in front of the Militia station and by the church, that they would shoot every tenth resident if those responsible for the riots were not caught. The officers began to plunder the abandoned farms again. Churchwarden Nowak was shot in the leg while attempting to escape. By the end of the day, the army had transported 36 residents of Kórnica to the Militia station in Głogówek, where interrogations took place. Militiamen beat civilians with iron batons. They accused Władysław of treason. Several of the prisoners managed to escape, including Elisabeth Sluzallek, who, on the third day of her imprisonment, climbed through a hole in a fence while sweeping the yard and fled through the park in Głogówek, Leśnik, and Błażejowice Dolne to her family in Zielina.

== Aftermath ==
The interrogations did not yield positive results. The residents of Kórnica did not reveal the names of those responsible for the rebellion. Over the next months, Polish authorities kept interrogating people in Kórnica. The Militia in Prudnik identified Stefan Wszołek, a militiaman from Gliwice, as the person responsible for the riot. He was familiar with the local area as he had been a forced labourer in Kórnica since 1942, and on 9 July he led four Russian soldiers to the village. The Prudnik Militia identified Franz Sacher, whom the report called "a former SS member and second officer of the German army", as the instigator of the attack. According to the report, Sacher was "the first to give the signal with a weapon in his hand and dragged the others along".

A few weeks after the incident, the Militia station was moved from the Kroll family's house to the Kasperek family's house in the centre of the village. The rebellious nature of Kórnica's residents contributed to the long-standing reluctance of Polish officials to assume civilian administration of the village. The consequence of the Polish representatives' behaviour, deemed "unlawful" and "sadistic" by the locals, was a loss of trust in the Polish state among Silesians and a loss of loyalty to Poland.

The events in Kórnica inspired a more brutal revolt of Silesians in nearby Walce, where a mob of locals armed with clubs and hoes marched on the building where the headmaster of a Polish school lived, shouting anti-Polish slogan and throwing rocks at the house. Polish militiamen who arrived in Walce from Prudnik were shot at several times, and two people were killed.

== Bibliography ==
- Smarzly, Andreas (2005). "Pół dnia wolności – wypadki kórnickie latem 1945 roku". Ziemia Prudnicka (in Polish). Prudnik: Spółka Wydawnicza "Aneks".
- Smarzly, Andreas (2021). "Der Körnitzer Aufstand 1945". Schlesische Geschichtsblätter – Zeitschrift für Regionalgeschichte Schlesiens (in German). 47. Karlstadt.
