= Kromołów =

Kromołów may refer to the following places in Poland:

- Kromołów, Silesian Voivodeship
- Kromołów, Opole Voivodeship
