= Georg Gyssling =

German diplomat (1893–1965)

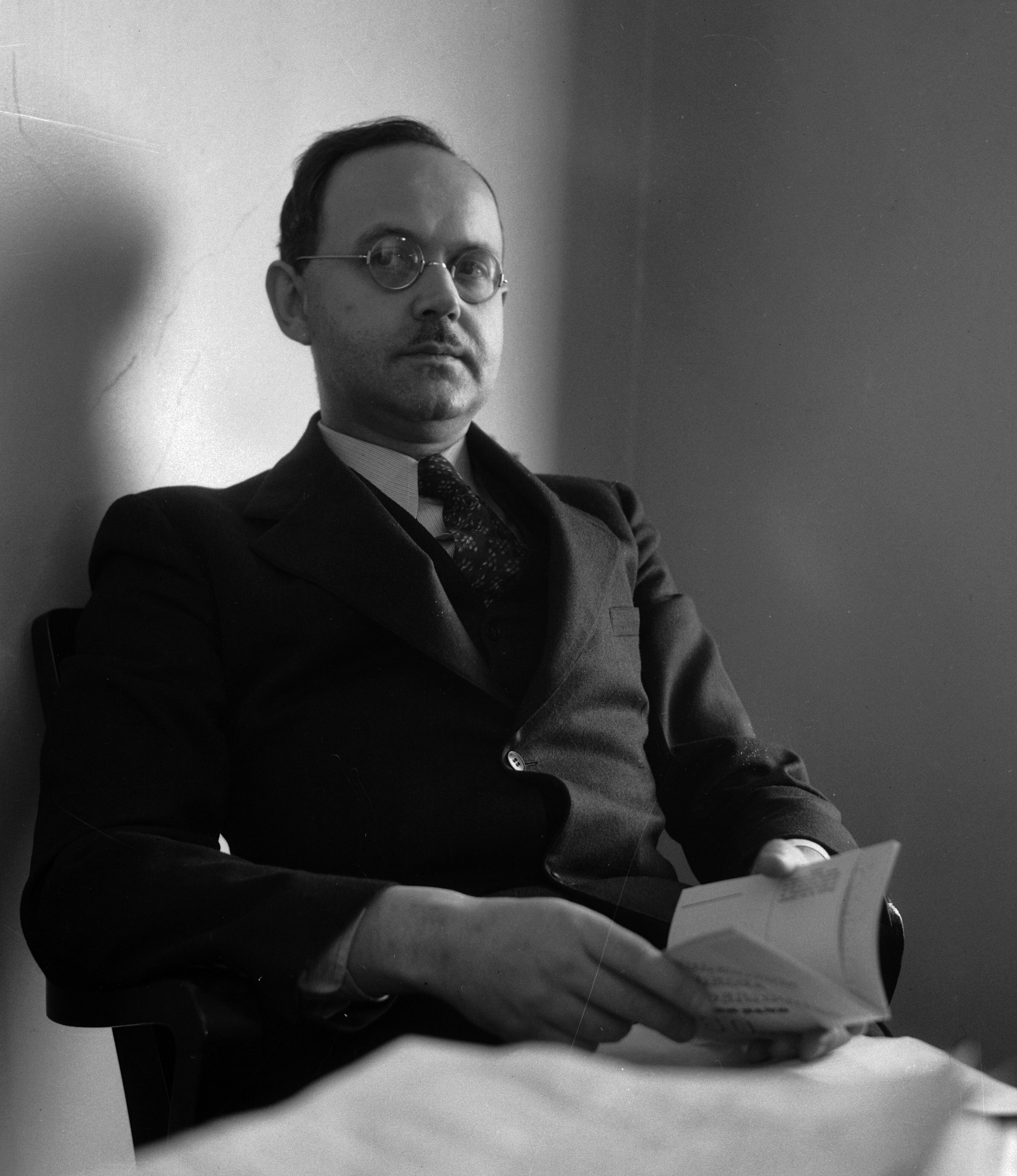
- Gyssling in the 1930s
- Born: Georg Gyssling; June 16, 1893; Walzen, German Empire (now Walce, Poland)
- Died: January 8, 1965 (aged 71); Spain
- Occupation: Diplomat
- Spouse: Ingrid Horn
- Children: 2

Georg Gyssling (16 June 1893 – 8 January 1965) was a German consul to the United States from 1927 until 1941, since 1933 in Los Angeles. He was a member of the Nazi Party from 1931.

== Early life ==
Gyssling was born in 1893 in Walzen, Upper Silesia, in Imperial Germany. He enlisted in the Imperial German Army during World War I, and after the war earned a doctorate of German law. He became a diplomat for the German Foreign Office and in 1927 arrived in the United States as a German Consul.

== Olympic career ==
Gyssling was also a bobsledder who competed in the early 1930s. The German team finished seventh and last in the four-man event at the 1932 Winter Olympics in Lake Placid, New York.

== Hitler’s man in Hollywood ==
Gyssling was the German Foreign Office representative in Los Angeles, and was sometimes referred to as "Hitler's Hollywood consul". He had a specific brief to monitor the activities of the studios, and by all accounts he was extremely diligent and effective in his duties. Nevertheless, later documents revealed that Gyssling despised Adolf Hitler and the Nazi Party, yearned for a return to a more democratic (albeit nationalistic) Germany, and gave classified information to American intelligence officials before World War II began. He is portrayed by Michael Siberry in the Amazon TV series The Last Tycoon.

== Personal life ==
Gyssling was married in 1925 to a German woman named Ingrid Horn, with whom he had two children, Georg and Angelica. Gyssling and Ingrid eventually divorced, and he died in southern Spain on January 8, 1965.

== See also ==
- Nazism and cinema
