= Walce Uprising =

1945 rebellion of Germans and Silesians against Polish authorities

| Date | 11–13 July 1945 |
| Location | Walce, Prudnik County, Poland 50°22′19″N 18°00′30″E |
| Result | Persecution of insurgents |

Belligerents
| (Germany) German residents (Upper Silesia) Silesian residents | (Poland) Militiamen of Prudnik |

Commanders and leaders
| Kubica | Kazimierz Wrona (MO Prudnik) |

Casualties and losses
| 2 killed | |

The Walce Uprising (Polish: powstanie w Walcach or bunt w Walcach) was a rebellion of Germans and Silesians of the village of Walce, then in Prudnik County, against the Polish authorities, in July 1945.

== Background ==
The Soviet Red Army entered Walce (then Walzen in Nazi Germany) on its way to Prudnik during the Upper Silesian offensive in March 1945. The local population fell victim to violence and looting from Soviet soldiers. From March to May 1945, Prudnik County was controlled by the Soviet military commandant's office. Following the capitulation of the German state, it was passed on to the Polish administration on 11 May 1945. The Polish administration provided protection, but began to confiscate property and persecute the local autochthonous people. On 9 July 1945, a rebellion of Germans and Silesian against the Citizens' Militia and the Polish authorities took place in the nearby village of Kórnica, known as the Kórnica Uprising. The rebellion was suppressed by Militia and military forces from Prudnik.

== Uprising ==
The events in Kórnica inspired the residents of Walce, dissatisfied with the Polish rule which they considered oppressive. They began their rebellion on 11 July 1945, two days after the Kórnica Uprising. A crowd of children, women, and men armed with sticks and hoes marched early in the morning towards the house where Bogusław Wesoły, the headmaster of the local Polish school, lived, along with two teachers: Marta Matlik and S. Pilich. The villagers shouted slogans described as "anti-state, anti-Polish, and directed against the Polish school authorities". They threw rocks at the building, breaking several windows. One participant pulled down a Polish from the building and trampled on it.

The residents broke down the door to the house and forced their way in. According to a report from the Militia in Prudnik, the teachers inside the building were rescued by a Russian soldier, Fyodor Filipovich, and a coachman named Marek Władysław.

On 13 July, an armed Militia unit from Prudnik, commanded by second lieutenant Kazimierz Wrona, arrived in Walce. The rebellious villagers fired several times at the Polish militiamen. Alwis Grasow fired with an automatic weapon. Wrona allowed the militiamen to open fire.

While escaping, the militiamen shot one person whose identity could not be established due to a lack of documents on them. They also shot Alwis Grasow, the man firing an automatic weapon, identified as an SS officer from Westphalia.

== Aftermath ==
The Militia of Prudnik identified a local German teacher named Kubica as the person responsible for the rebellion. At the request of the Polish teachers, the Prudnik County Militia established a permanent station in Walce.

Another rebellion against Polish school authorities took place in the nearby village of Kierpień, where women beat up a Polish teacher for abusing their children because they spoke only German or Silesian.

== Bibliography ==
- Smarzly, Andreas (2021). "Der Körnitzer Aufstand 1945". Schlesische Geschichtsblätter – Zeitschrift für Regionalgeschichte Schlesiens (in German). 47. Karlstadt.
