= Olszyna, Opole Voivodeship =

Olszyna
- Village
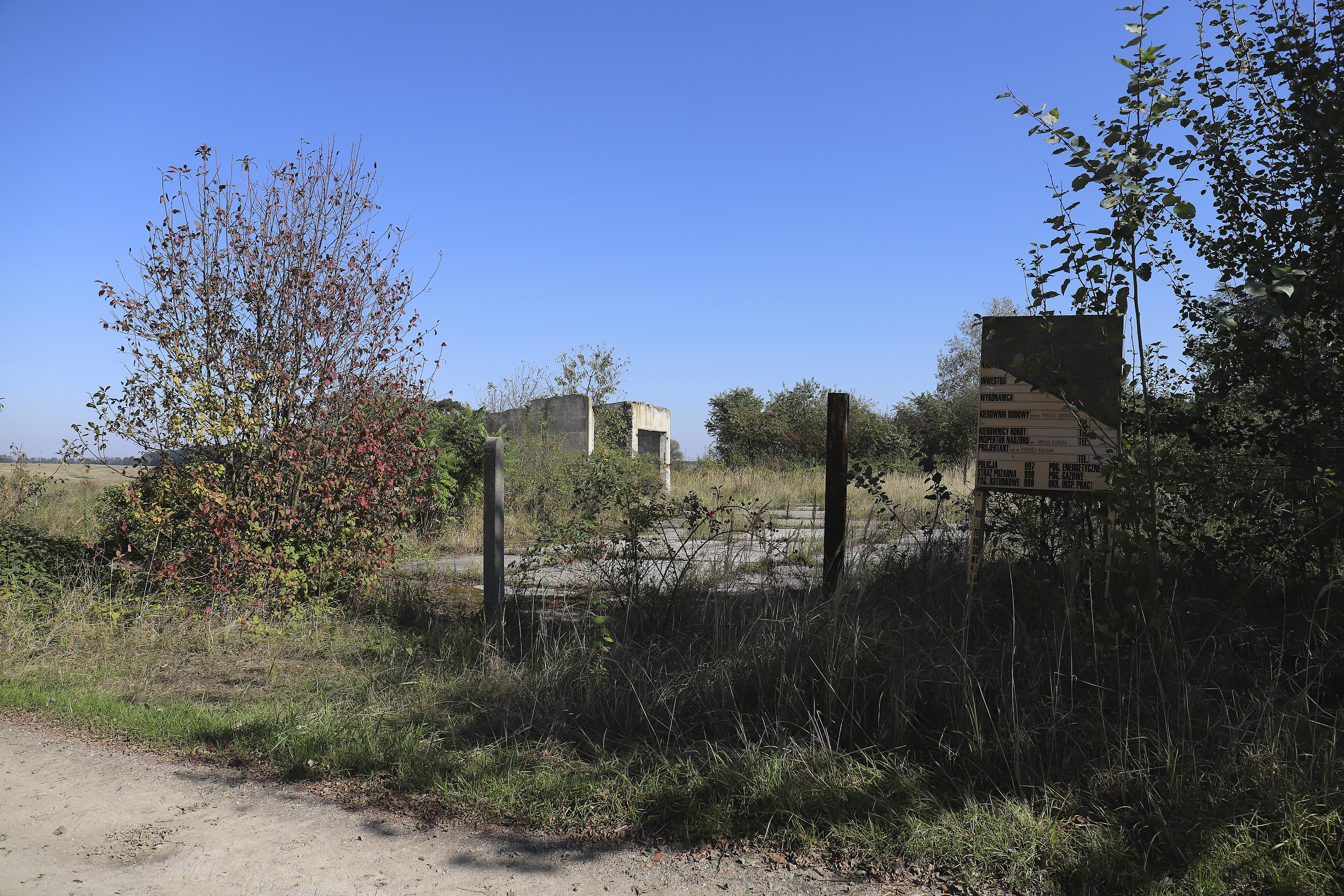

- Location within Poland
- Coordinates: 50°21′53″N 17°55′09″E
- Country: Poland
- Voivodeship: Opole
- County: Krapkowice
- Gmina: Walce
- Time zone: UTC+1 (CET)
  - Summer (DST): UTC+2
- Postal code: 47-344
- Area code: +4877
- Vehicle registration: OKR

Olszyna (German: Olschina) is a village in the administrative district of Gmina Walce, within Krapkowice County, Opole Voivodeship, in southern Poland. It is situated in the historical region of Prudnik Land.

== Etymology ==
The village was known as Olschina in German. In 1936, Nazi administration of Germany changed the village's name to Erlen in attempt to erase traces of Polish origin. Following the Second World War, the Polish name Olszyna was reintroduced by the Commission for the Determination of Place Names on 2 April 1949.
