= Brzezina, Krapkowice County =

Brzezina
- Village
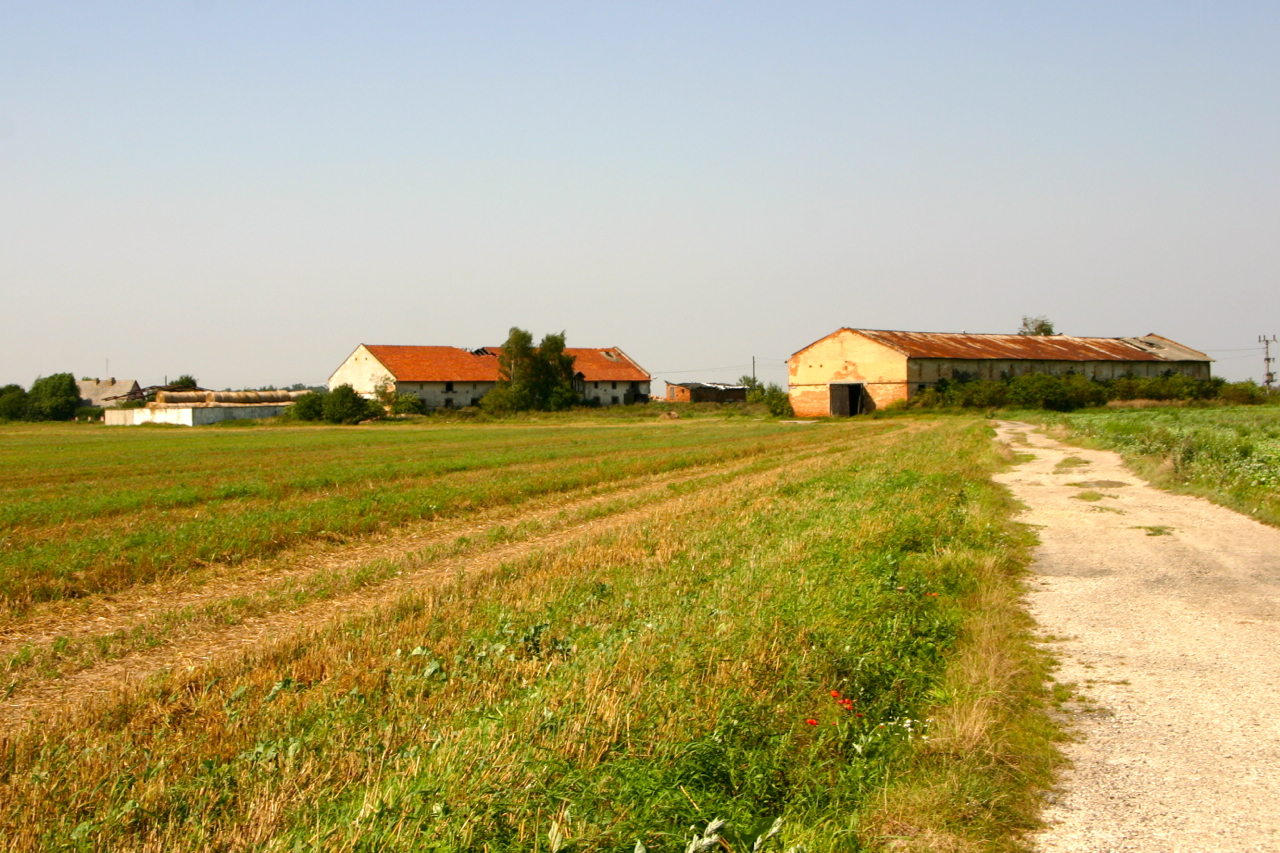

- Location within Poland
- Coordinates: 50°23′21″N 17°56′31″E
- Country: Poland
- Voivodeship: Opole
- County: Krapkowice
- Gmina: Walce
- Elevation: 190 m (620 ft)

Brzezina [bʐɛˈʑina] (German: Breschina) is a village in the administrative district of Gmina Walce, within Krapkowice County, Opole Voivodeship, in south-western Poland.

== See also ==
- Prudnik Land
