= Grocholub =

- Village
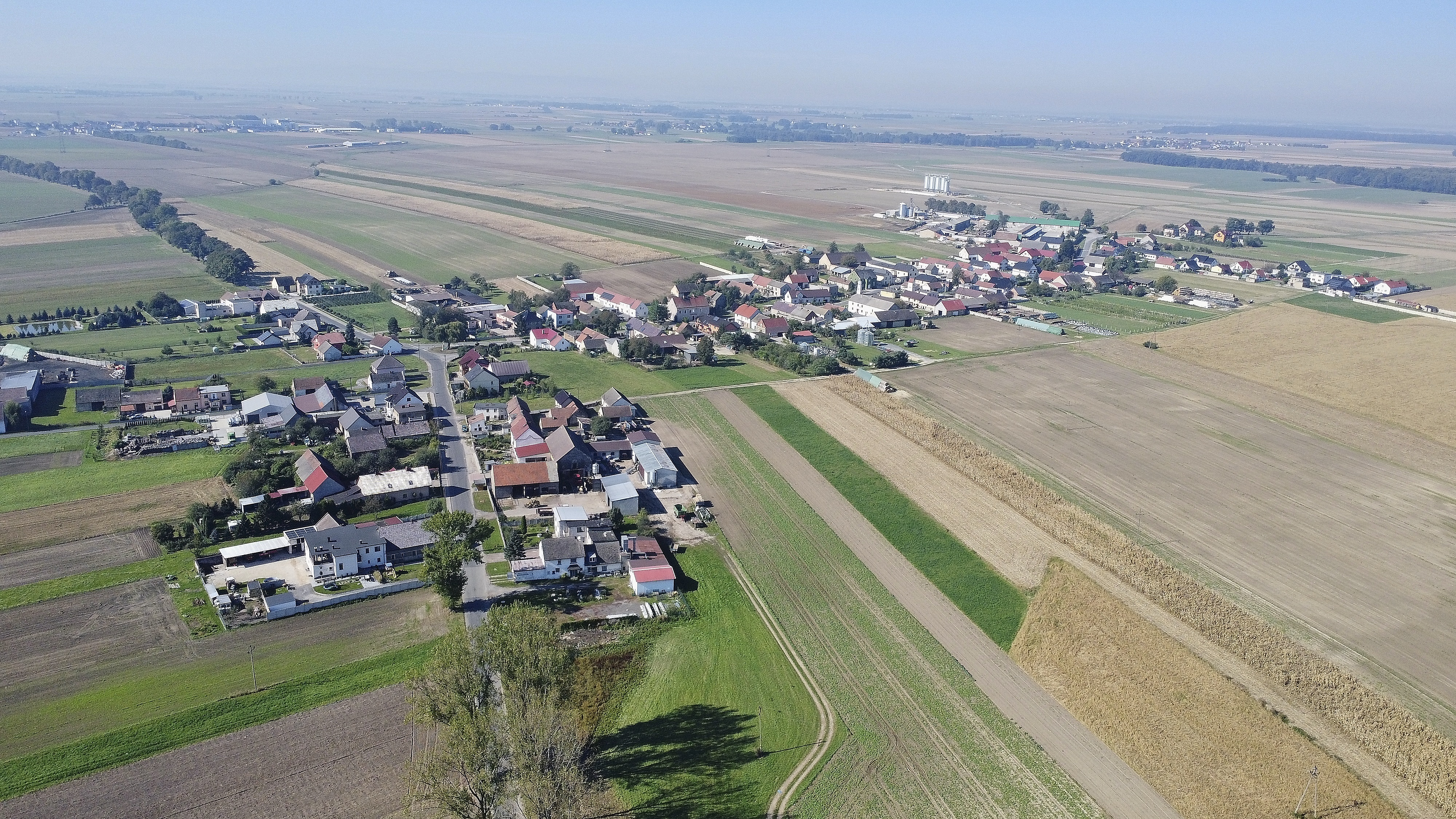

- Location within Poland
- Coordinates: 50°23′33″N 18°1′11″E
- Country: Poland
- Voivodeship: Opole
- County: Krapkowice
- Gmina: Walce
- First mentioned: 1228
- Time zone: UTC+1 (CET)
  - Summer (DST): UTC+2 (CEST)
- Vehicle registration: OKR

Grocholub [ɡrɔˈxɔlup] is a village, in the administrative district of Gmina Walce, within Krapkowice County, Opole Voivodeship, in southern Poland.

== History ==
The village was first mentioned in a document of Duke Casimir I of Opole from 1228, when it was part of fragmented Piast-ruled Poland. Later on, it was also part of Bohemia (Czechia), Prussia, and Germany. In 1936, during a massive Nazi campaign of renaming of placenames, it was renamed to Erbersdorf to erase traces of Polish origin. During World War II, the Germans operated the E156 forced labour subcamp of the Stalag VIII-B/344 prisoner-of-war camp in the village. After the defeat of Germany in the war, in 1945, the village became part of Poland and its historic name was restored.

== See also ==
- Prudnik Land
