= Rybarze =

- Village
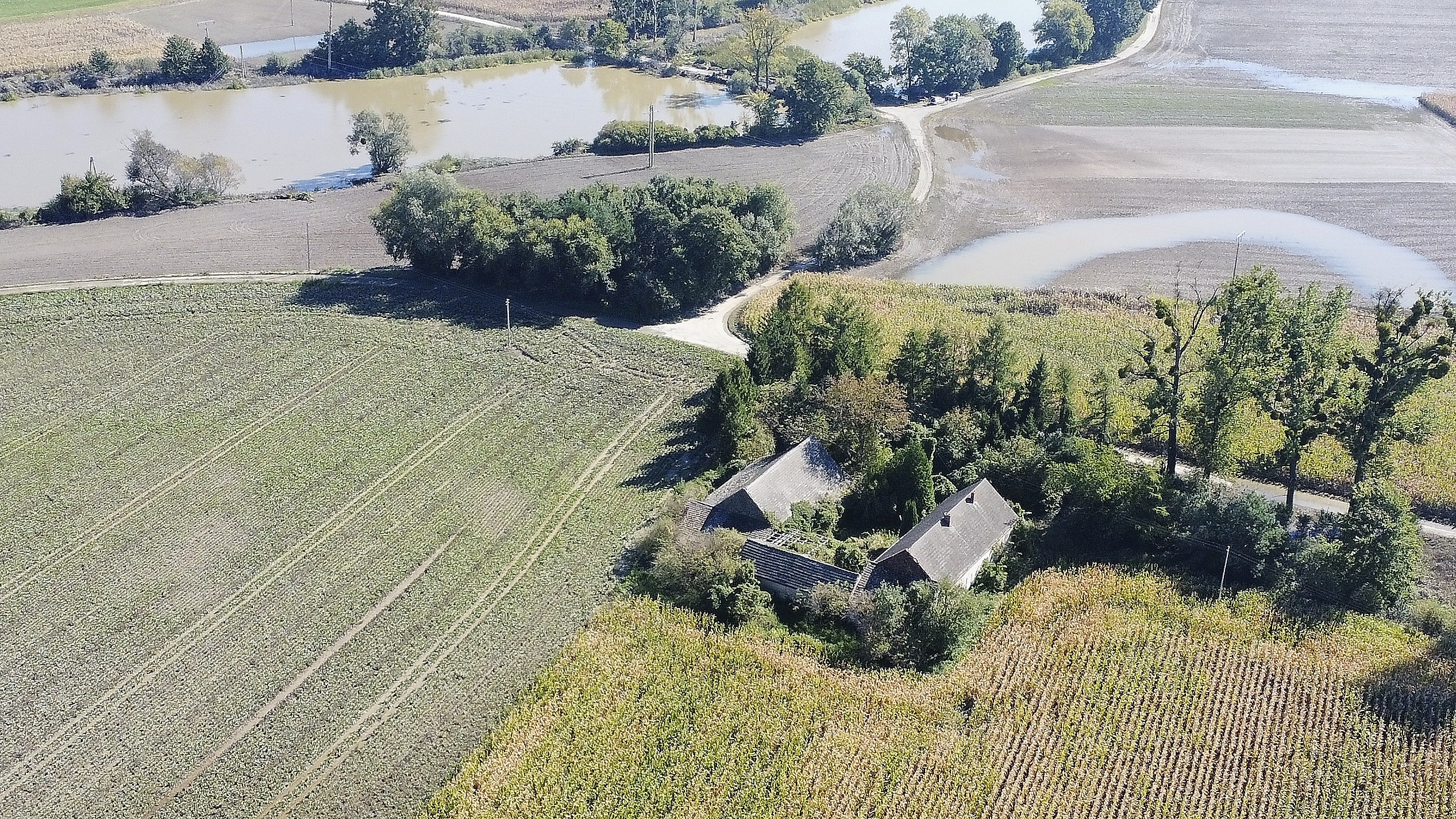

- Location within Poland
- Coordinates: 50°25′20″N 18°3′29″E
- Country: Poland
- Voivodeship: Opole
- County: Krapkowice
- Gmina: Walce

Rybarze [rɨˈbaʐɛ] is a village in the administrative district of Gmina Walce, within Krapkowice County, Opole Voivodeship, in south-western Poland.
