= Krzewiaki =

- Village
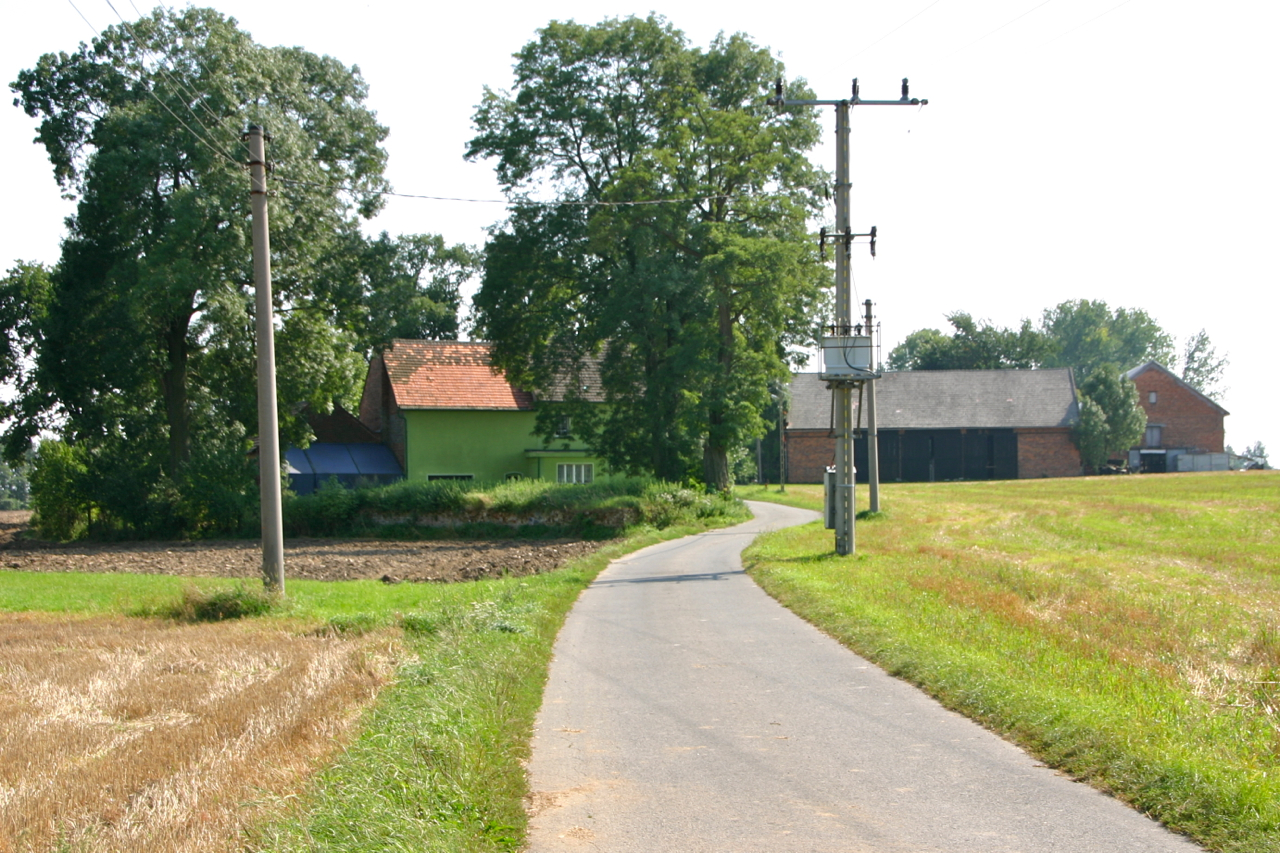

- Location within Poland
- Coordinates: 50°22′56″N 18°1′21″E
- Country: Poland
- Voivodeship: Opole
- County: Krapkowice
- Gmina: Walce

Krzewiaki [kʂɛˈvjaki] (German: Strauchhäuser) is a village in the administrative district of Gmina Walce, within Krapkowice County, Opole Voivodeship, in south-western Poland.

== See also ==
- Prudnik Land
