= Dobieszowice, Opole Voivodeship =

Dobieszowice Dobersdorf
- Village
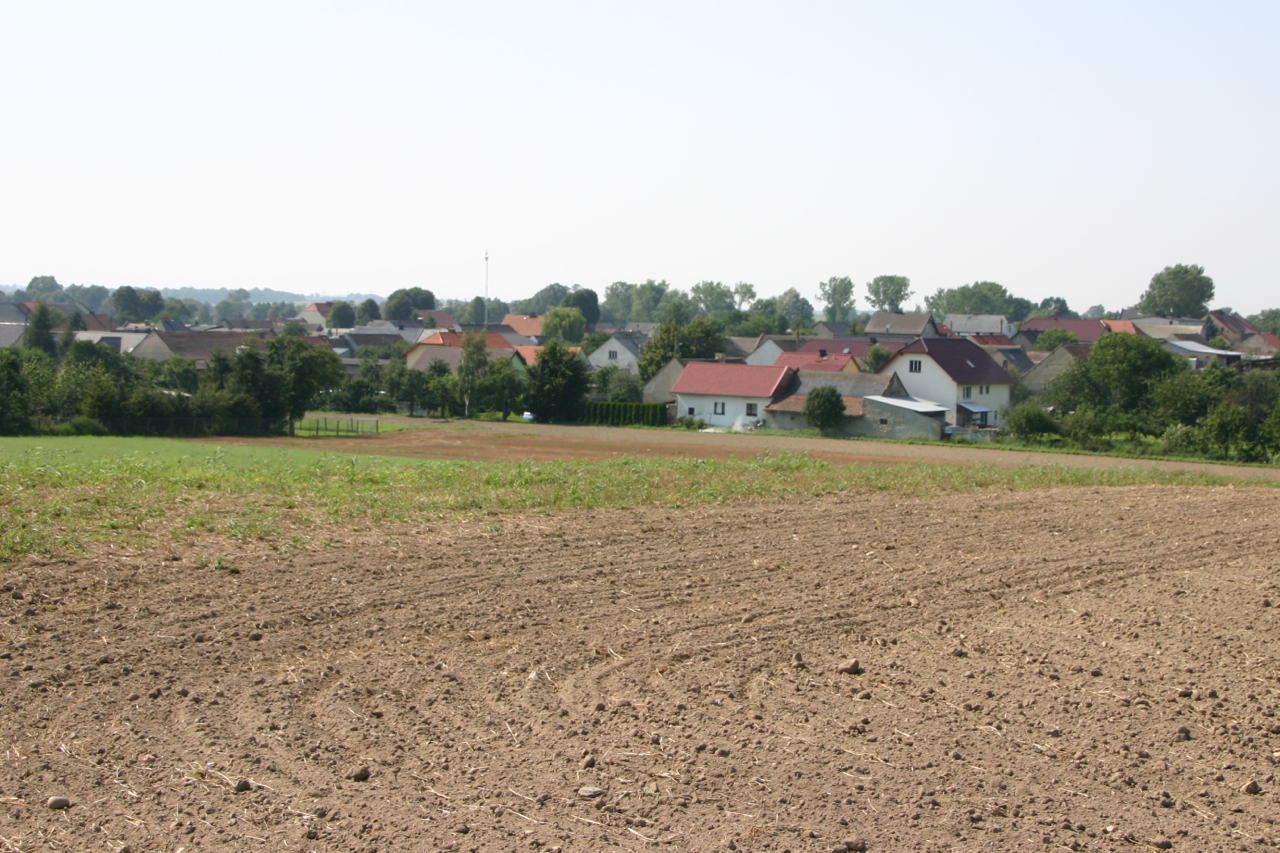

- Location within Poland
- Coordinates: 50°21′44″N 18°1′34″E
- Country: Poland
- Voivodeship: Opole
- County: Krapkowice
- Gmina: Walce
- Time zone: UTC+1 (CET)
  - Summer (DST): UTC+2 (CEST)
- Vehicle registration: OKR

Dobieszowice ([dɔbjɛʂɔˈvit͡sɛ], additional name in German: Dobersdorf) is a village in the administrative district of Gmina Walce, within Krapkowice County, Opole Voivodeship, in southern Poland.

== History ==
Historically, the village was known in Polish as Dobieszowice, Dobierzów and Dobieszowo. The name is derived from the Old Polish male name Dobiesław.

In the Upper Silesian Plebiscite on March 20, 1921, 304 votes were given for the village to stay part of Germany, while 85 were given for the village to rejoin Poland. Accordingly, Dobersdorf stayed part of Weimar Germany.

== See also ==
- Prudnik Land
