= Ćwiercie =

Ćwiercie Schwärze
- Village
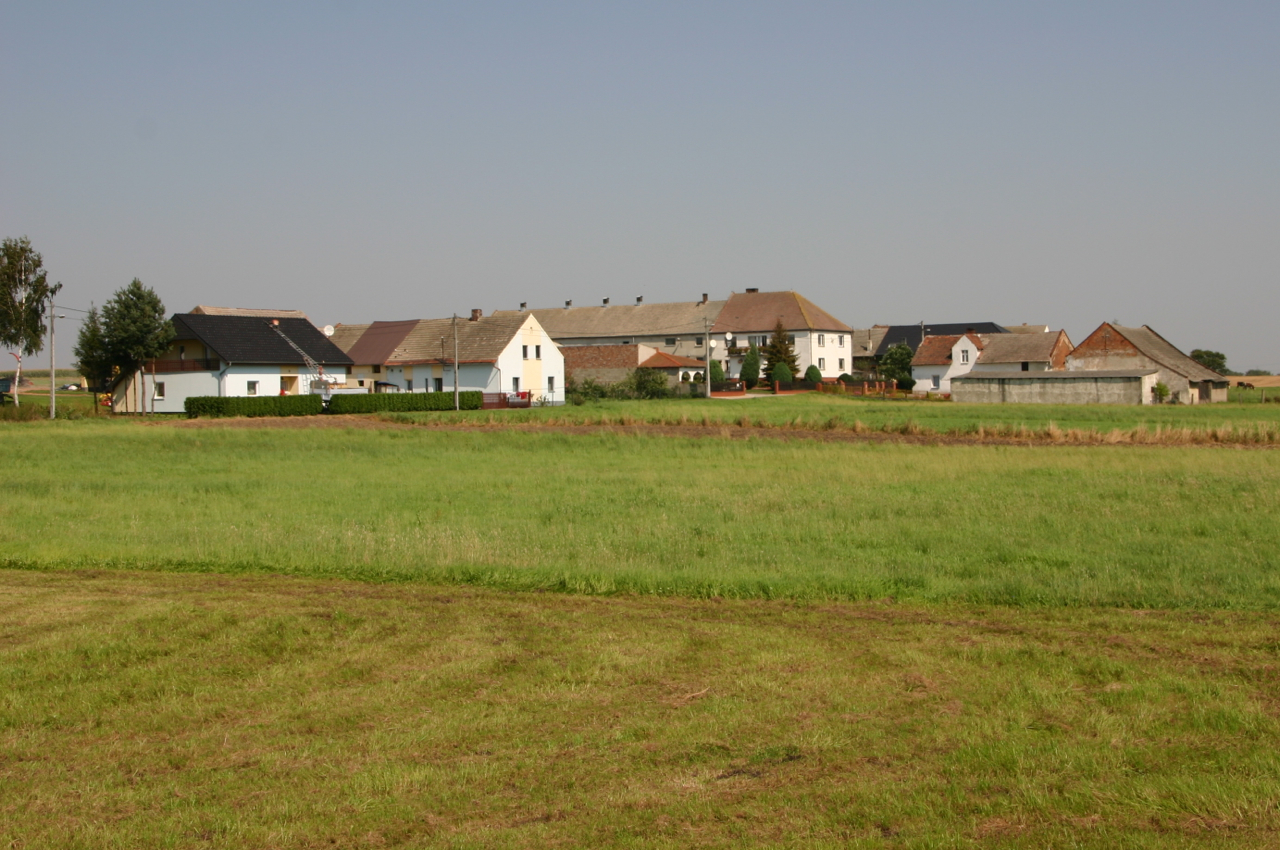

- Location within Poland
- Coordinates: 50°23′18″N 17°57′33″E
- Country: Poland
- Voivodeship: Opole
- County: Krapkowice
- Gmina: Walce
- Time zone: UTC+1 (CET)
  - Summer (DST): UTC+2 (CEST)
- Vehicle registration: OKR

Ćwiercie ([ˈt͡ɕfjɛrt͡ɕɛ], additional name in German: Schwärze) is a village in the administrative district of Gmina Walce, within Krapkowice County, Opole Voivodeship, in southern Poland.

== See also ==
- Prudnik Land
