= Swornica =

- Village
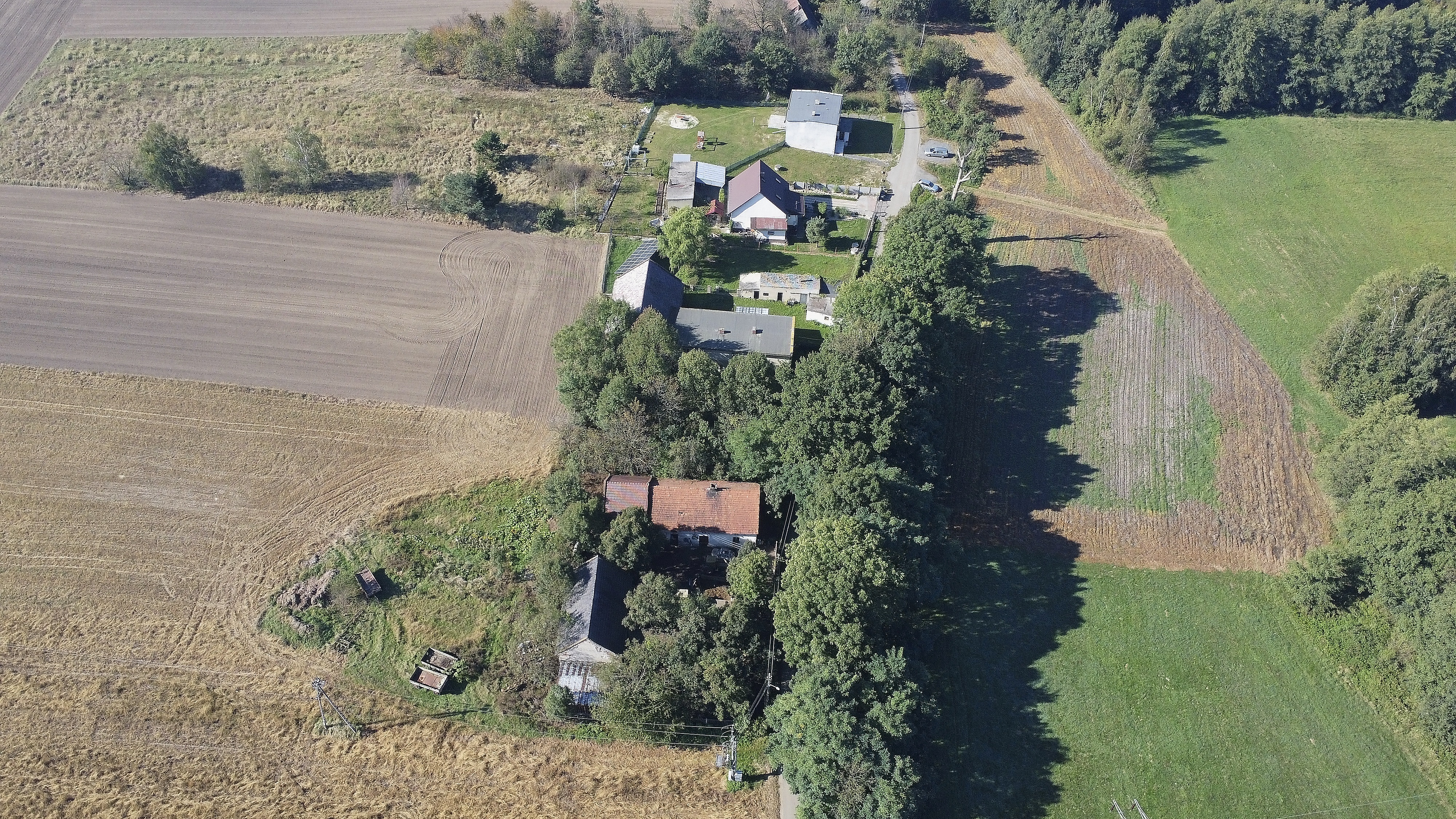

- Location within Poland
- Coordinates: 50°24′24″N 18°00′27″E
- Country: Poland
- Voivodeship: Opole
- County: Krapkowice
- Gmina: Walce

Swornica [sfɔrˈnit͡sa] (German: Swornitza) is a village in the administrative district of Gmina Walce, within Krapkowice County, Opole Voivodeship, in south-western Poland.

== See also ==
- Prudnik Land
