= Rozkochów, Opole Voivodeship =

Rozkochów Rosnochau
- Village
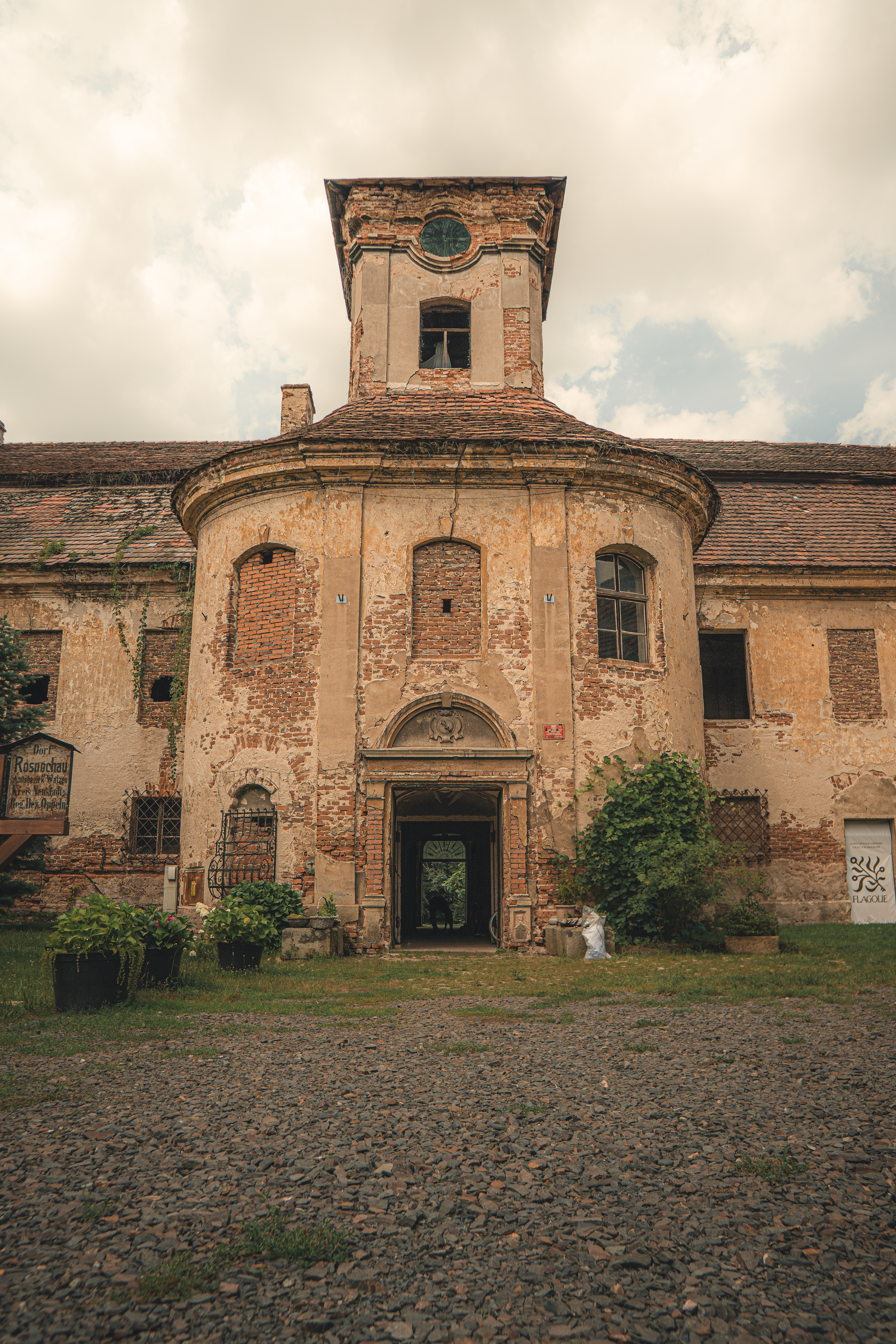
- Rozkochów Palace

- Location within Poland
- Coordinates: 50°22′9″N 17°56′32″E
- Country: Poland
- Voivodeship: Opole
- County: Krapkowice
- Gmina: Walce

Population
  - Total: 640
- Time zone: UTC+1 (CET)
  - Summer (DST): UTC+2 (CEST)
- Vehicle registration: OKR
- Website: http://www.rozkochow.pl

Rozkochów ([rɔsˈkɔxuf], additional name in German: Rosnochau) is a village in the administrative district of Gmina Walce, within Krapkowice County, Opole Voivodeship, in southern Poland.

== See also ==
- Prudnik Land
