= Posiłek, Gmina Walce =

Posiłek
- Village
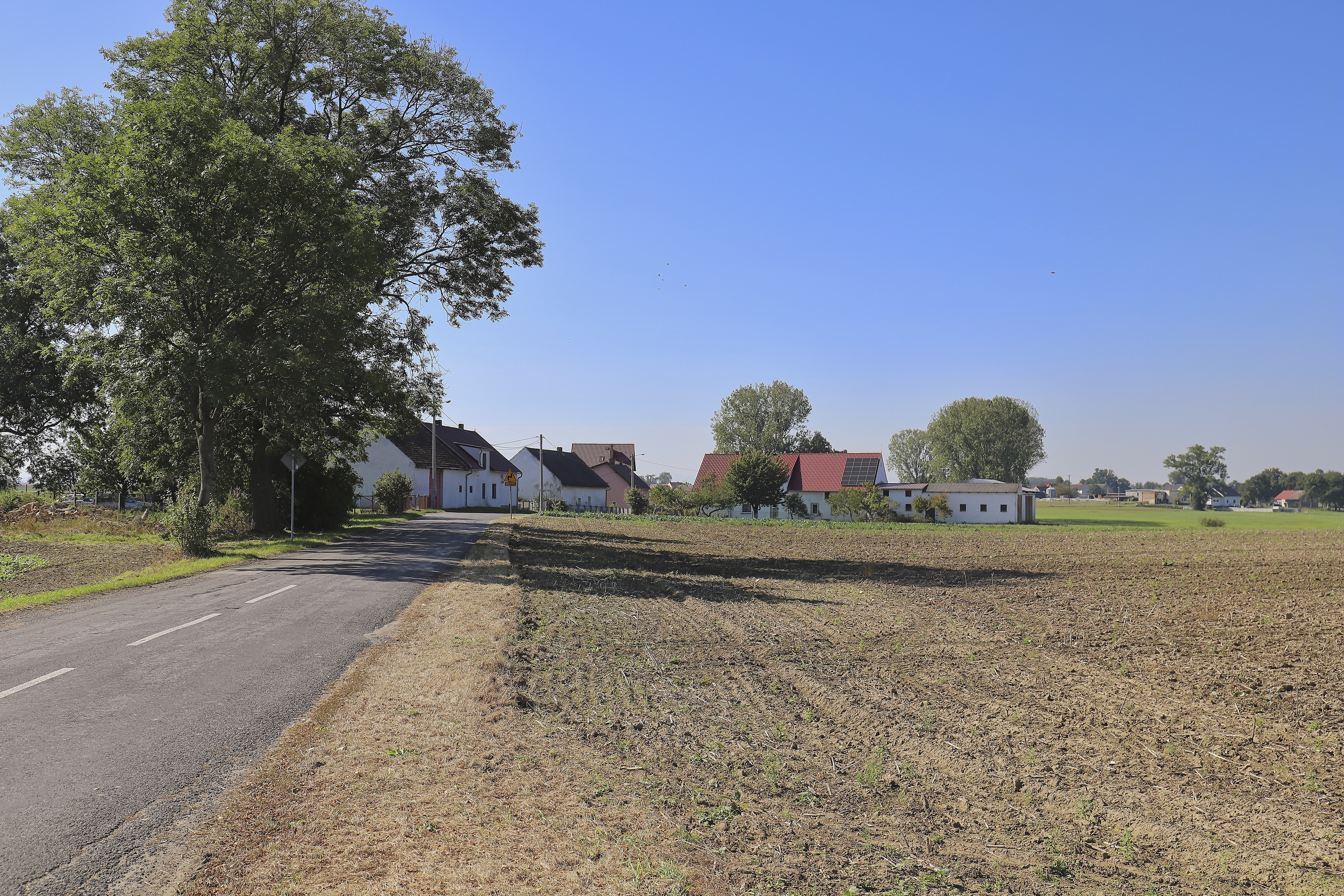

- Location within Poland
- Coordinates: 50°23′12″N 17°59′9″E
- Country: Poland
- Voivodeship: Opole
- County: Krapkowice
- Gmina: Walce

Posiłek [pɔˈɕiwɛk] (German: Poschillek) is a village in the administrative district of Gmina Walce, within Krapkowice County, Opole Voivodeship, in south-western Poland.

== See also ==
- Prudnik Land
