= Gmina Walce =

Gmina Walce Gemeinde Walzen Walce Commune
- Gmina
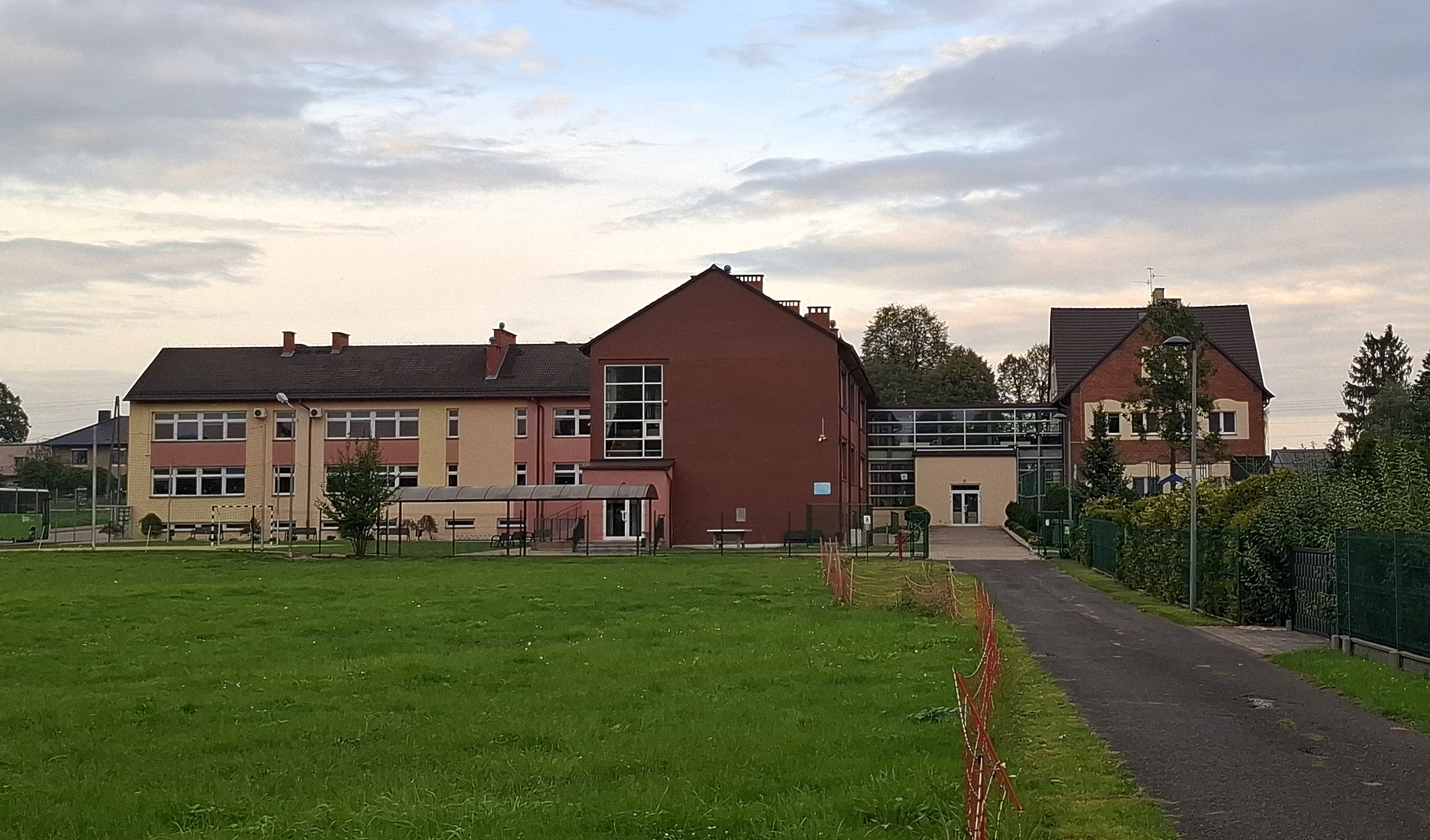
- Elementary school in Walce

- Coat of arms
- Interactive map of Gmina Walce
- Coordinates (Walce): 50°22′19″N 18°0′21″E
- Country: Poland
- Voivodeship: Opole
- County: Krapkowice
- Seat: Walce

Area
  - Total: 69.29 km^{2} (26.75 sq mi)

Population (2019-06-30)
  - Total: 5,438
  - Density: 78.48/km^{2} (203.3/sq mi)
- Time zone: UTC+1 (CET)
  - Summer (DST): UTC+2 (CEST)
- Vehicle registration: OKR
- Website: http://www.walce.pl

Gmina Walce (German: Gemeinde Walzen) is a rural gmina (administrative district) in Krapkowice County, Opole Voivodeship, in southern Poland. Its seat is the village of Walce, which lies approximately 11 kilometres (7 mi) south of Krapkowice and 34 km (21 mi) south of the regional capital Opole.

The gmina covers an area of 69.29 square kilometres (26.8 sq mi), and as of 2019, its total population was 5,438. Since 2006, the commune, like much of the area, has been bilingual in Polish and German.

== Administrative divisions ==
The commune contains the villages and settlements of:

- Walce
- Antoszka
- Brożec
- Brzezina
- Ćwiercie
- Czerniów
- Dobieszowice
- Groble
- Grocholub
- Kromołów
- Krzewiaki
- Marianków
- Olszyna
- Posiłek
- Przerwa
- Rozkochów
- Rybarze
- Stradunia
- Swornica
- Zabierzów

== Neighbouring gminas ==
Gmina Walce is bordered by the gminas of Głogówek, Krapkowice, Reńska Wieś and Zdzieszowice.

== Twin towns – sister cities ==
Gmina Walce is twinned with:

- Kobylnica, Poland
- Malá Morávka, Czech Republic
