= Stradunia =

Stradunia Straduna
- Village
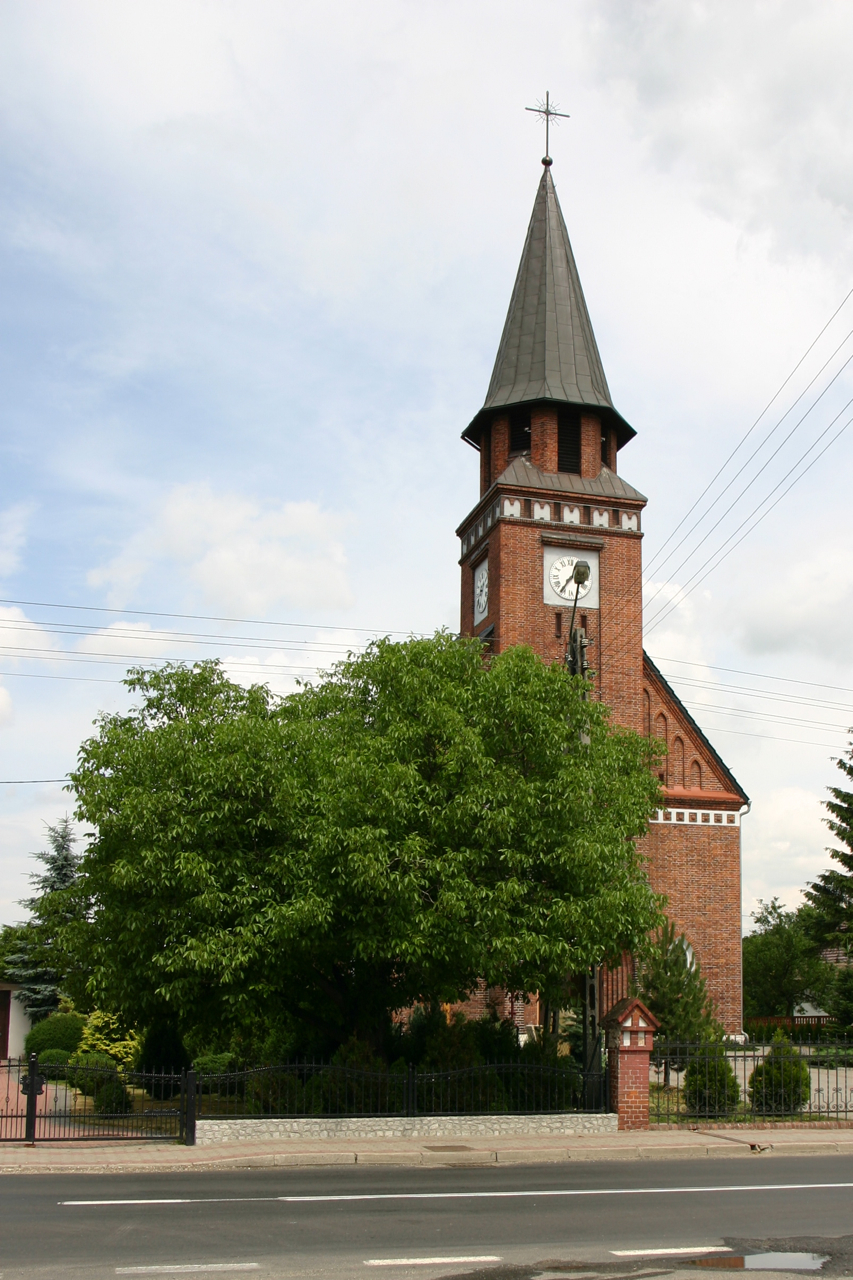

- Location within Poland
- Coordinates: 50°24′44″N 18°2′49″E
- Country: Poland
- Voivodeship: Opole
- County: Krapkowice
- Gmina: Walce
- Time zone: UTC+1 (CET)
  - Summer (DST): UTC+2 (CEST)
- Vehicle registration: OKR

Stradunia ([straˈduɲa], additional name in German: Straduna) is a village in the administrative district of Gmina Walce, within Krapkowice County, Opole Voivodeship, in southern Poland.
