= Marianków, Krapkowice County =

Marianków
- Village
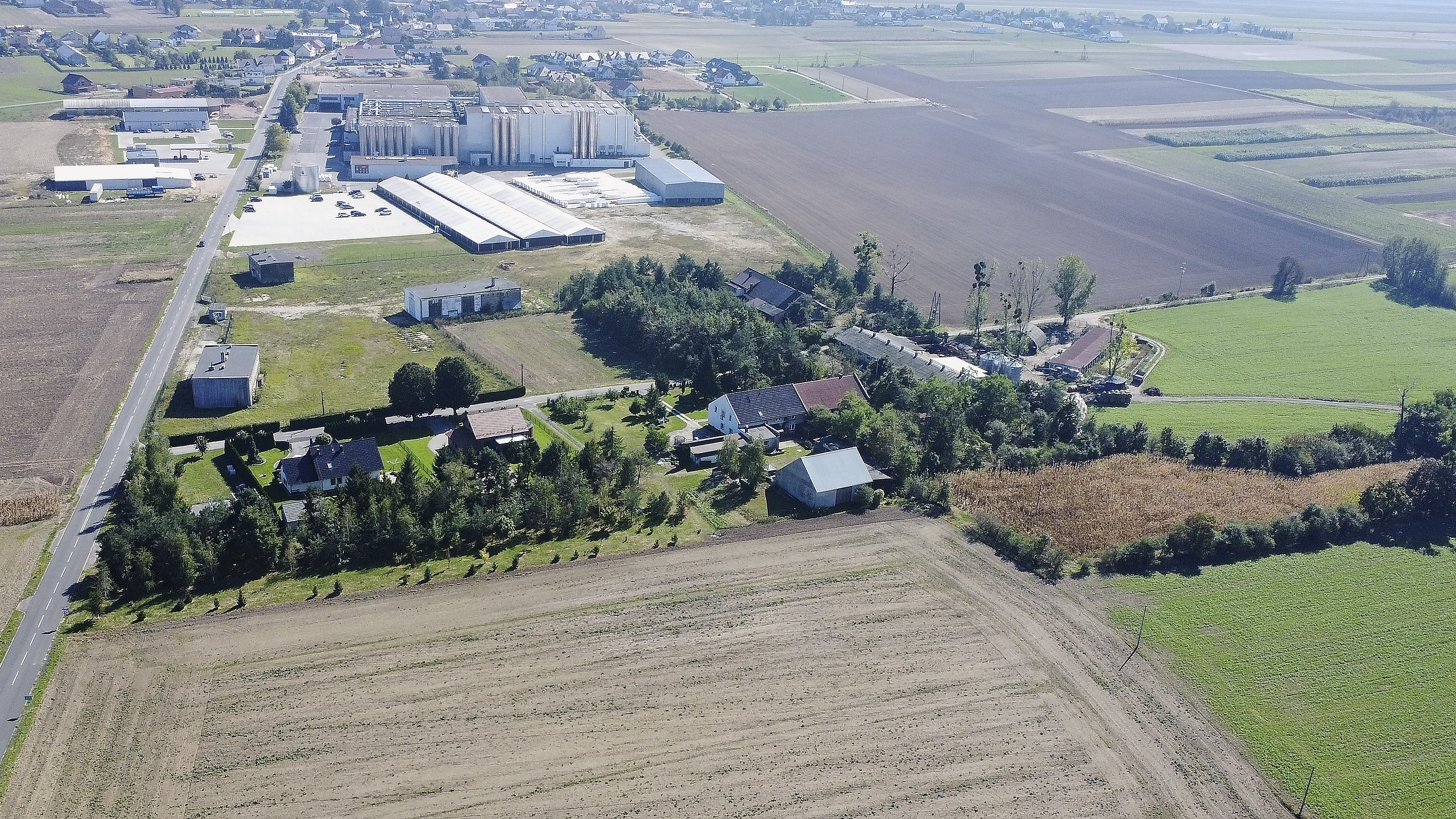

- Location within Poland
- Coordinates: 50°22′58″N 17°59′28″E
- Country: Poland
- Voivodeship: Opole
- County: Krapkowice
- Gmina: Walce
- Time zone: UTC+1 (CET)
  - Summer (DST): UTC+2
- Postal code: 47-344
- Area code: +4877
- Vehicle registration: OKR

Marianków (German: Mariannenhof) is a village in the administrative district of Gmina Walce, within Krapkowice County, Opole Voivodeship, in south-western Poland. It is situated in the historical region of Prudnik Land.
