= Czerniów =

- Village
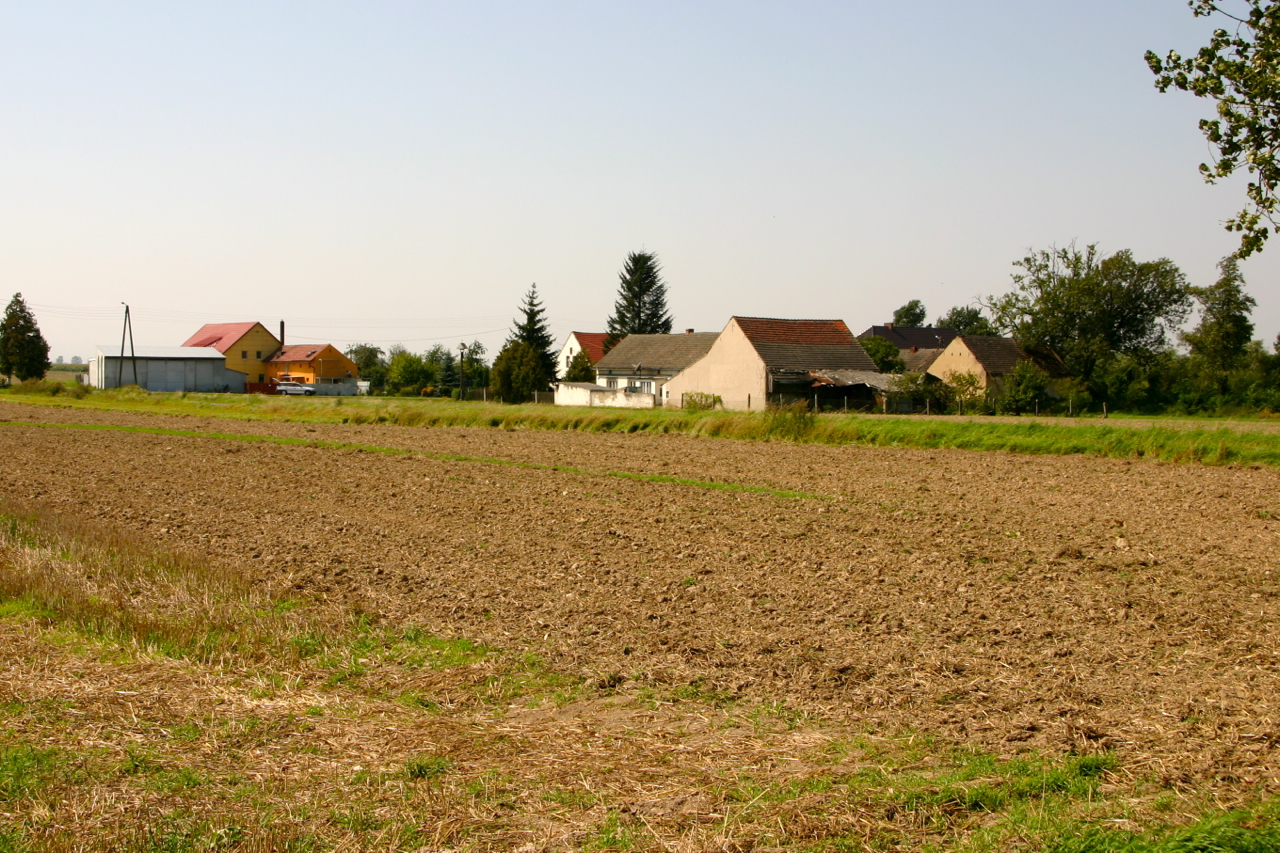

- Location within Poland
- Coordinates: 50°24′8″N 17°56′51″E
- Country: Poland
- Voivodeship: Opole
- County: Krapkowice
- Gmina: Walce

Czerniów [ˈt͡ʂɛrɲuf] (German: Schernow) is a village in the administrative district of Gmina Walce, within Krapkowice County, Opole Voivodeship, in south-western Poland.

== See also ==
- Prudnik Land
