= Przerwa, Opole Voivodeship =

Przerwa
- Village
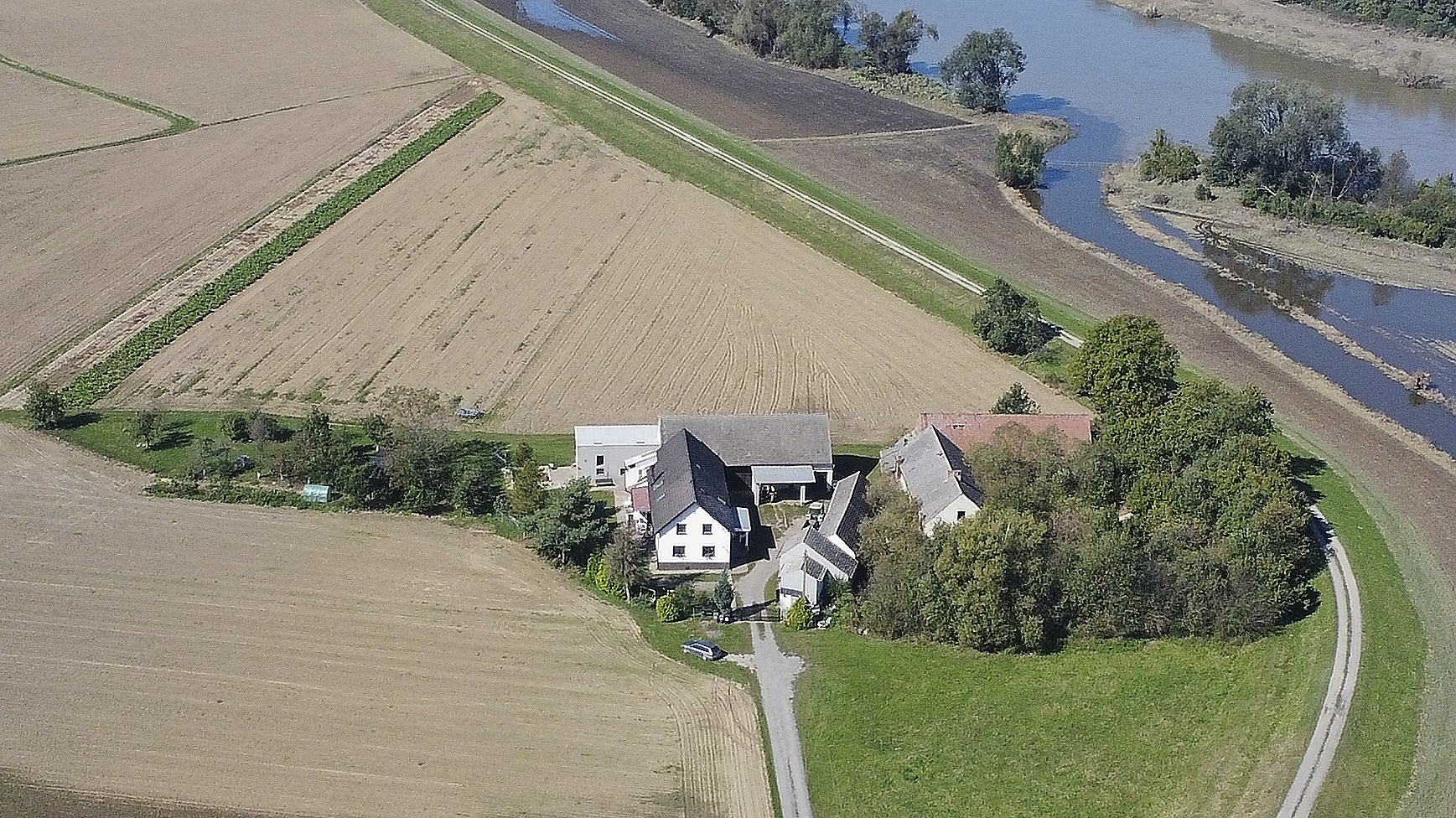

- Location within Poland
- Coordinates: 50°25′33″N 18°3′6″E
- Country: Poland
- Voivodeship: Opole
- County: Krapkowice
- Gmina: Walce

Przerwa [ˈpʂɛrva] is a village in the administrative district of Gmina Walce, within Krapkowice County, Opole Voivodeship, in south-western Poland.
