= Groble, Krapkowice County =

Groble Grobla
- Village
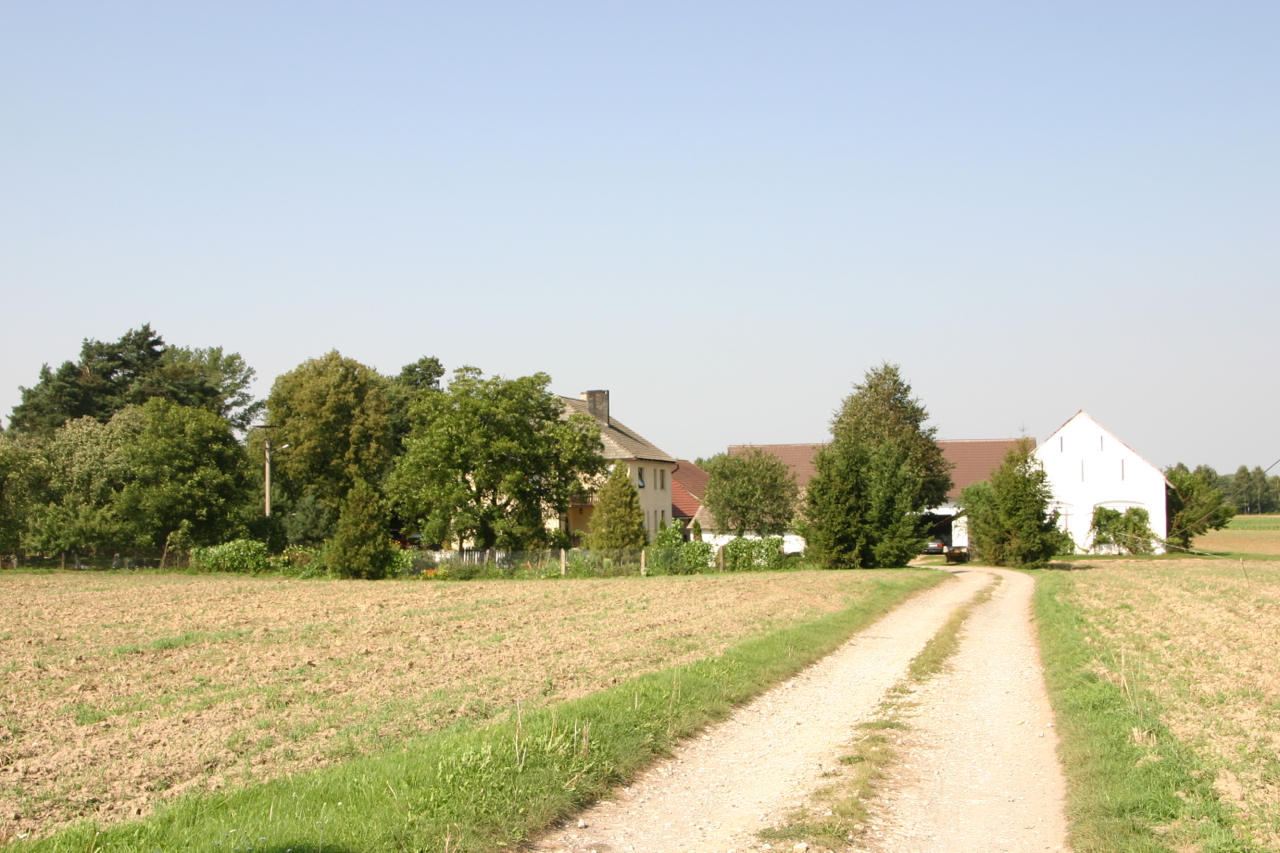

- Location within Poland
- Coordinates: 50°22′42″N 18°01′30″E
- Country: Poland
- Voivodeship: Opole
- County: Krapkowice
- Gmina: Walce
- Time zone: UTC+1 (CET)
  - Summer (DST): UTC+2
- Postal code: 47-344
- Area code: +4877
- Vehicle registration: OKR

Groble (additional name in German: Grobla) is a village in the administrative district of Gmina Walce, within Krapkowice County, Opole Voivodeship, in southern Poland. It is situated in the historical region of Prudnik Land.
