= Kórnica =

Village in Silesia

Kórnica Kōrnica
- Village
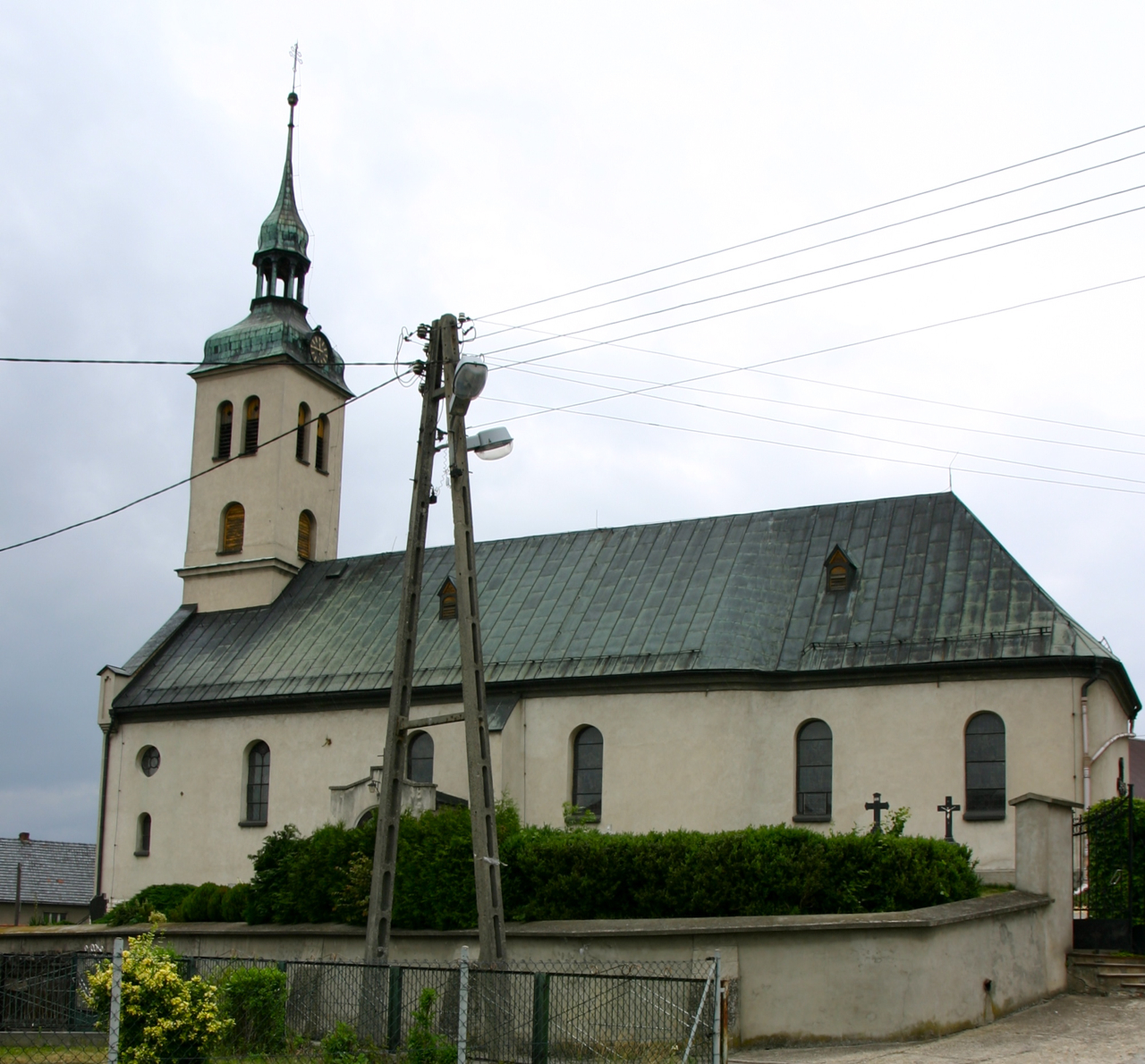

- Location within Poland
- Coordinates: 50°24′N 17°55′E
- Country: Poland
- Voivodeship: Opole
- County: Krapkowice
- Gmina: Krapkowice
- Postal code: 47-351

Kórnica [kurˈnit͡sa] (Silesian: Kōrnica; German: Körnitz) is a village in the administrative district of Gmina Krapkowice, within Krapkowice County, Opole Voivodeship, in southern Poland.

The name of the village is of Polish origin and comes from the word kura, which means "chicken". In the 19th-century Geographical Dictionary of the Kingdom of Poland it was noted as Kurnica.

In July 1945, the village was the site of the Kórnica Uprising—a rebellion of local Germans and Silesians against the Polish authorities.

== See also ==
- Prudnik Land
