= Kromołów, Opole Voivodeship =

Kromołów Kramelau
- Village
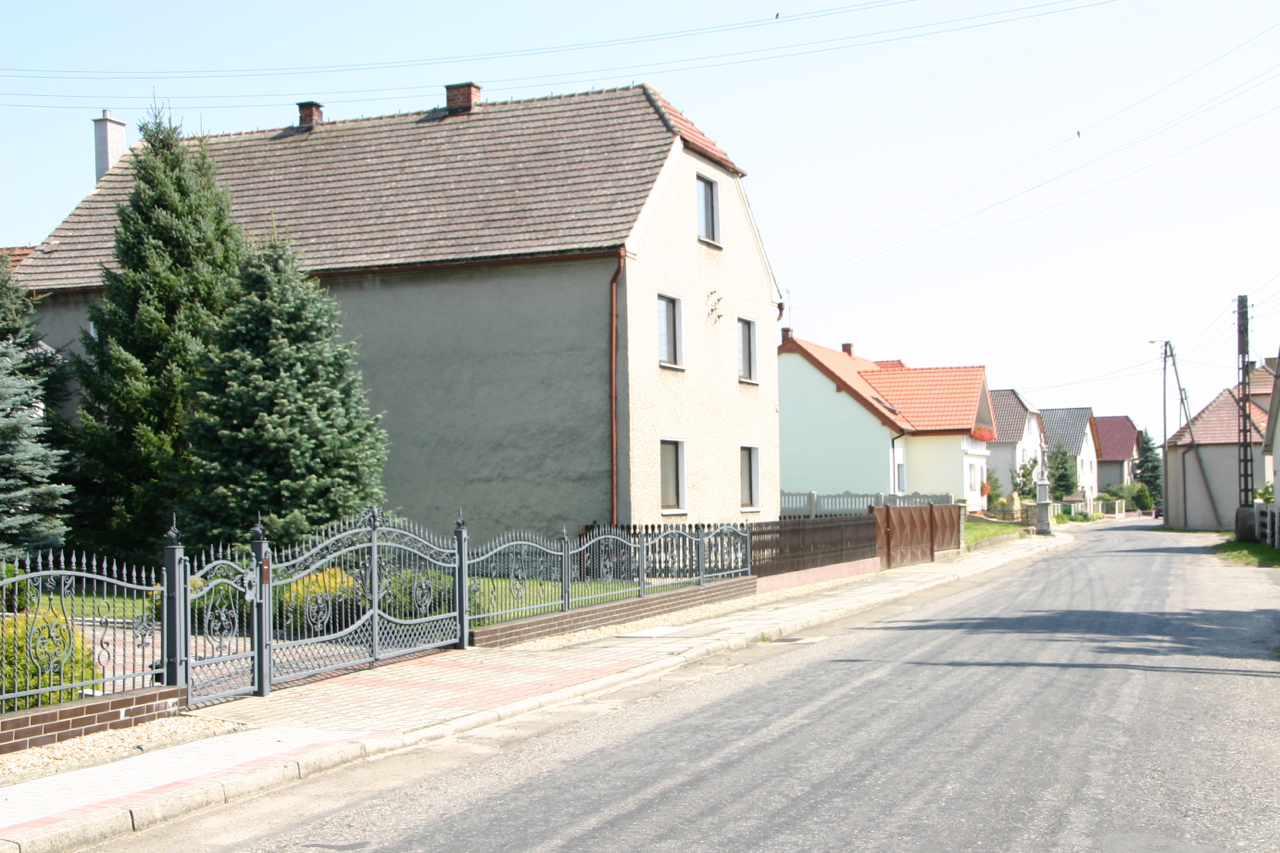
- A road through Kromołów

- Location within Poland
- Coordinates: 50°24′2″N 17°58′19″E
- Country: Poland
- Voivodeship: Opole
- County: Krapkowice
- Gmina: Walce

Population
  - Total: 469
- Time zone: UTC+1 (CET)
  - Summer (DST): UTC+2 (CEST)
- Vehicle registration: OKR

Kromołów ([krɔˈmɔwuf], additional name in German: Kramelau) is a village in the administrative district of Gmina Walce, Krapkowice County, Opole Voivodeship, southern Poland.

== See also ==
- Prudnik Land
