= Błażejowice Dolne =

Błażejowice Dolne Blaschewitz
- Village
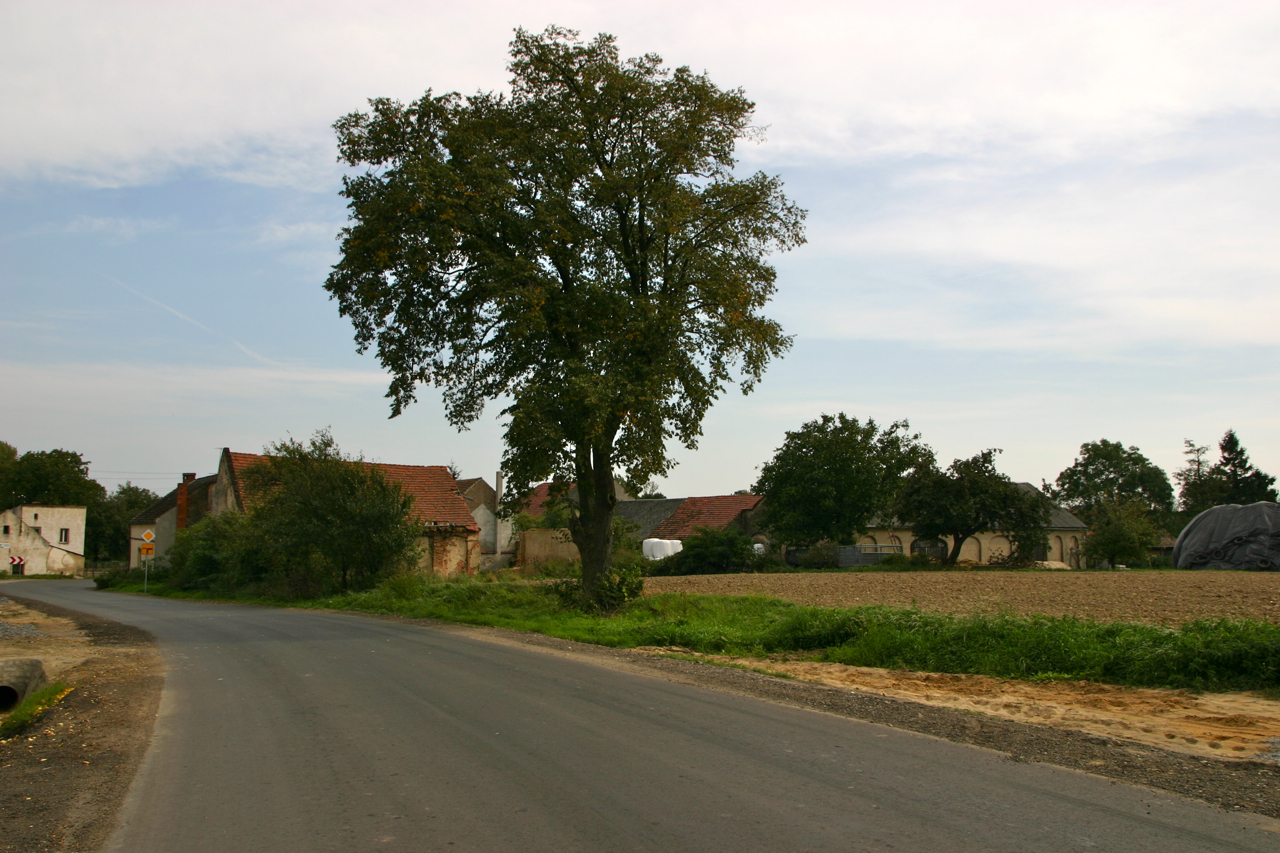

- Location within Poland
- Coordinates: 50°22′39″N 17°49′18″E
- Country: Poland
- Voivodeship: Opole
- County: Prudnik
- Gmina: Głogówek
- Established: 13th century
- First mentioned: 1358

Population (2021)
  - Total: 146
- Time zone: UTC+1 (CET)
  - Summer (DST): UTC+2
- Postal code: 48-250
- Area code: +4877
- Vehicle registration: OPR

Błażejowice Dolne ([bwaʐɛjɔˈvit͡sɛ ˈdɔlnɛ], additional name in German: Blaschewitz) is a village in the administrative district of Gmina Głogówek, within Prudnik County, Opole Voivodeship, southern Poland. It is situated in the historical region of Prudnik Land in Upper Silesia.

As of 31 December 2021, the village's population numbered 146 inhabitants. A significant portion of them belongs to the German minority in Poland.

== Geography ==
The village is located in the southern part of Opole Voivodeship, close to the Czech Republic–Poland border. It is situated in the historical Prudnik Land region, as well as in Upper Silesia. It lies in the Silesian Lowlands. The sołectwo of Błażejowice Dolne has an area of 573 hectares (1,420 acres).

== Etymology ==
The name Błażejowice Dolne was derived from the name Błażej, which is a Polish analogue to Blasius. It was first recorded in 1358 as Blazycowicz. In Topographisches Handbuch von Oberschlesien, published in 1865, Felix Triest noted the village's German name as Blaschewitz. It was noted under its Polish name Błażejowice in the Geographical Dictionary of the Kingdom of Poland from 1880 and in Konstanty Damrot's work on the origins of place names in Silesia from 1896. On 18 August 1936, Nazi administration of the German Reich changed the village's name to Niederblasien.

Following the Second World War, the Polish name Błażejowice is used since 1946. The name Błażejowice Dolne was introduced by the Commission for the Determination of Place Names on 9 September 1947. As Gmina Głogówek gained the bilingual status on 1 December 2009, the government introduced an additional German name for the village: Blaschewitz.

== History ==
Traces of human presence in the area of the present-day village of Błażejowice Dolne, confirmed by archaeological research, date back to the Neolithic period. There are also traces of Vandal presence. People inhabited this area continuously, until the Middle Ages.

The village was established within medieval Piast-ruled Poland during a period of German colonization of Silesia in the 13th century. Its name was first recorded in a document published in 1358. The second mention was in 1460. The name of the person who established the village was presumably Błażej (Blasius, Blažej). In 1383, knight Heinrich Kuropes sold the village to Adam Bess.

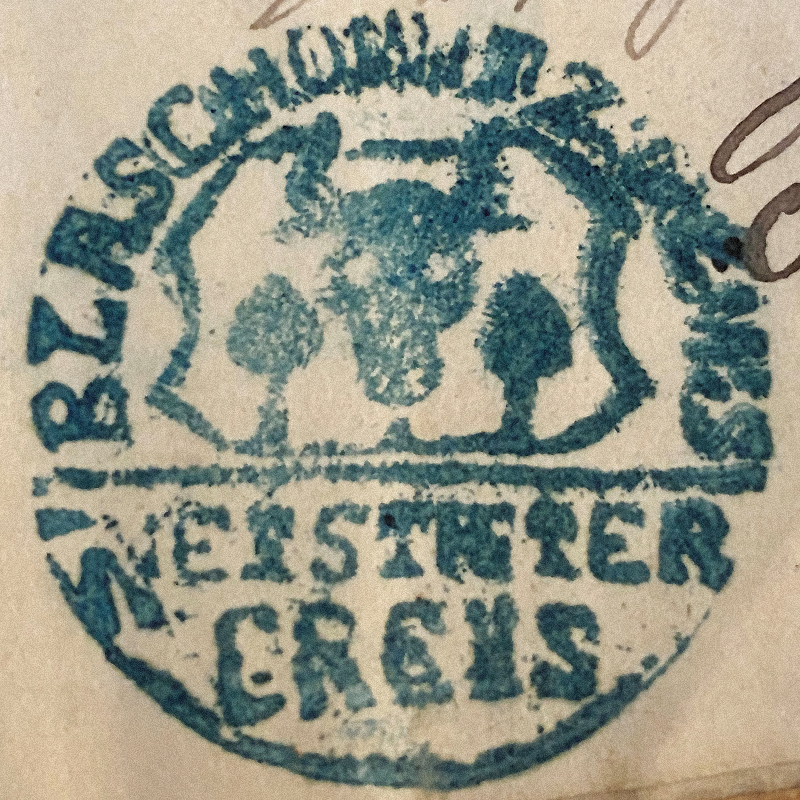
19th-century sigil

Until 1532 it was part of the Piast-ruled Duchy of Opole and Racibórz formed as a result of the medieval fragmentation of Poland into smaller duchies. Afterwards, it was integrated into the Bohemian Crown and Habsburg Empire, administratively becoming part of Głogówek County (circulus superioris Glogoviae) until 1742, and returning to Polish rule under the House of Vasa from 1645 to 1666. After the First Silesian War, it was annexed by the Kingdom of Prussia was incorporated into Prudnik County (Großkreis Neustadt). The village had its own sigil. In 1865, there were 13 farmers, 15 gardeners and 8 peasants living in the village. There was also a Catholic school, attended by 85 students.

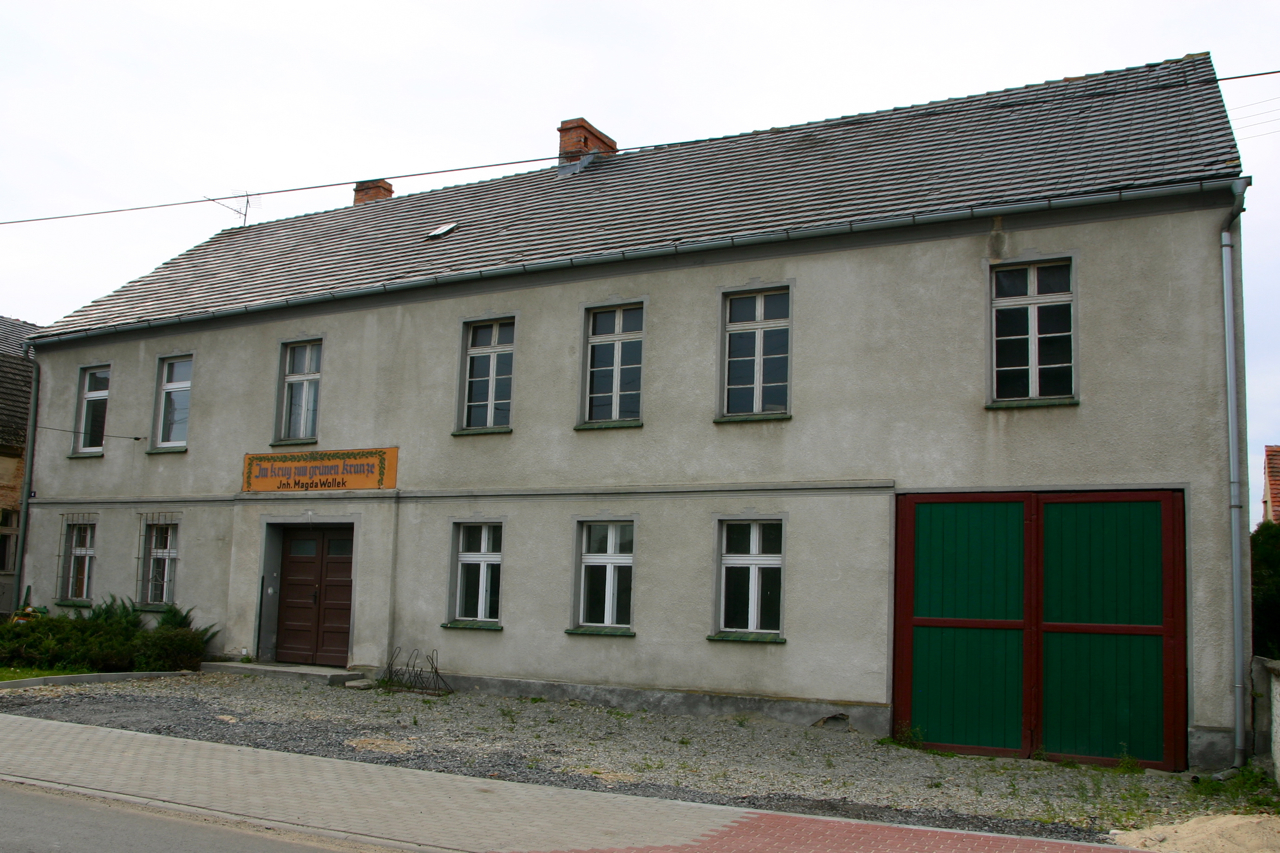
Former inn "Im Krug zum grünen Kranze"

According to the 1 December 1910 census, among 338 inhabitants of Błażejowice Dolne, 248 spoke Polish, 14 spoke German, and 76 were bilingual. In the village, there was an inn named "Im Krug zum grünen Kranze", run by Magdalena Wollek. After the First World War, a monument dedicated to people from Błażejowice Dolne who died in the war, was erected in the village. Only a portion of Prudnik County participated in the 1921 Upper Silesia plebiscite, which was supposed to determine ownership of the Province of Upper Silesia between Germany and Poland. Błażejowice Dolne found itself in the eastern part of the county, within the plebiscite area. 210 people of Błażejowice Dolne voted to remain in Germany, and 14 voted to reunite with Poland. In the end Błażejowice Dolne remained in Germany.

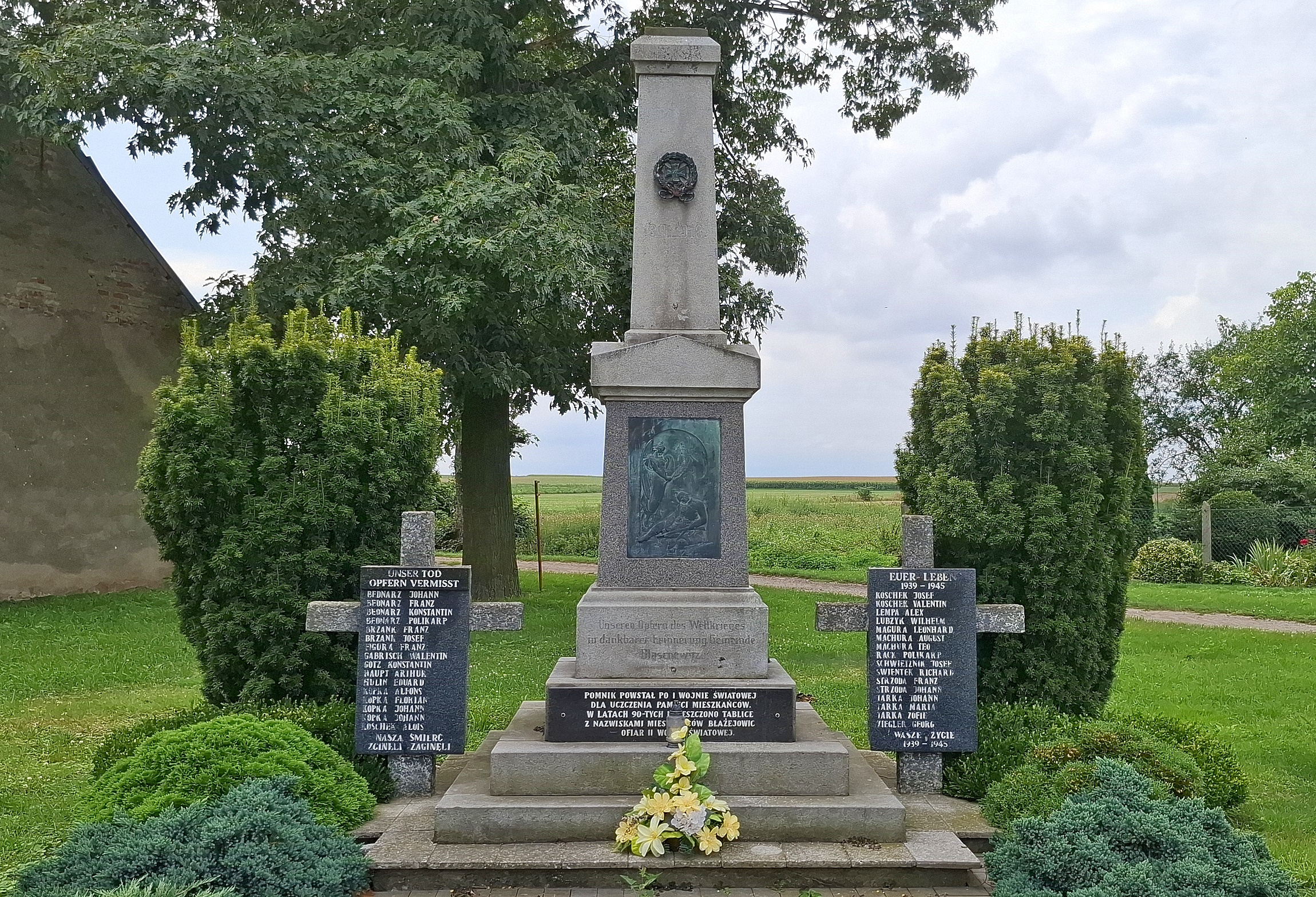
War monument

During the Second World War, on 18 March 1945, the Soviet Red Army encircled several German divisions in the area of Błażejowice Dolne. The 20th Waffen Grenadier Division of the SS (1st Estonian) stationed here. On 19 March, a command post of the 344th Infantry Division of the Wehrmacht was set up in the village. Late in the evening of 19 March, Błażejowice Dolne was abandoned by German soldiers, refugees, and most of its inhabitants, and it was captured by the Red Army.

Following the Second World War, from March to May 1945 Prudnik County was controlled by the Soviet military commandant's office. On 11 May 1945, it was passed on to the Polish administration. Autochthonous inhabitants of Błażejowice Dolne, who either knew Polish, including Silesian, were allowed to remain in the village. On 1 March 1947, local family of Jan Terka was murdered by bandits.

The village became a part of Silesian Voivodeship in 1945. It belongs to Opole Voivodeship since 1950. In the years 1945–1954, the village belonged to Gmina Gostomia in Prudnik County. From 1954 until 1959, it was the seat of a local gromada (the lowest tier of local government). It belonged to the post office in Biała.

In 1956, a library was established in Błażejowice Dolne. The local Voluntary Fire Brigade station was constructed in 1957. There was a theatrical group active in the village. The local agricultural production cooperative was established in the late 1970s. In 2010, Blażejowice Dolne joined the Opole Village Renewal Program.

== Demographics ==
Błażejowice Dolne is inhabited by Poles, Silesians and Germans, belonging to the registered German minority in Poland. The residents speak the Prudnik dialect of the Silesian language. The villaged gained the bilingual Polish-German status in 2009.

== Bibliography ==
- Lesiuk, Wiesław (1978). Ziemia Prudnicka. Dzieje, gospodarka, kultura. Urząd Miasta i Gminy w Prudniku, Wydawnictwo Instytutu Śląskiego w Opolu. OCLC 251643861.
- Smarzly, Andreas M. (2014). Blaschewitz (Kreis Neustadt OS) – Geschichte eines oberschlesischen Dorfes. Görlitz: Landeskundliche Schriftenreihe der Historischen Kommission für den Kreis Neustadt/Oberschlesien e.V.
- "Plan odnowy wsi Błażejowice Dolne" (PDF). bip.glogowek.pl (in Polish). 2020.
