= Walce =

Walce Walzen
- Village
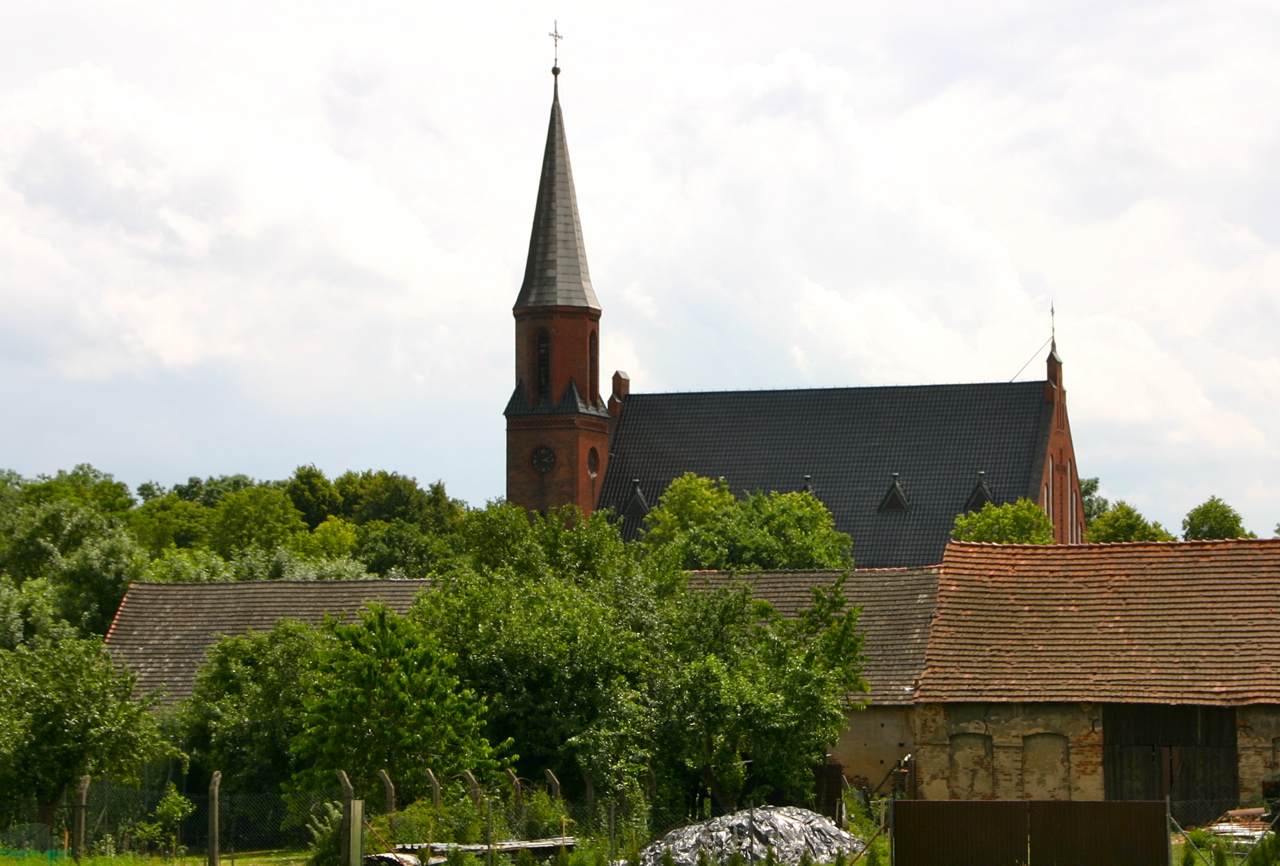
- Saint Valentine church

- Location within Poland
- Coordinates: 50°22′19″N 18°0′21″E
- Country: Poland
- Voivodeship: Opole
- County: Krapkowice
- Gmina: Walce

Population
  - Total: 2,100
- Time zone: UTC+1 (CET)
  - Summer (DST): UTC+2 (CEST)
- Vehicle registration: OKR

Walce ([ˈvalt͡sɛ], additional name in German: Walzen) is a village in Krapkowice County, Opole Voivodeship, in southern Poland. It is the seat of the gmina (administrative district) called Gmina Walce.

== History ==
The local Catholic church burned down in 1703, after which it was rebuilt and then expanded in 1805. In 1885, the village along with the adjacent estate had a population of 1,427.

In July 1945, the village was the site of the Walce Uprising—a rebellion of local Germans and Silesians against the Polish authorities.

== See also ==
- Prudnik Land
