= Grażyna Rutowska =

Silesian photographer

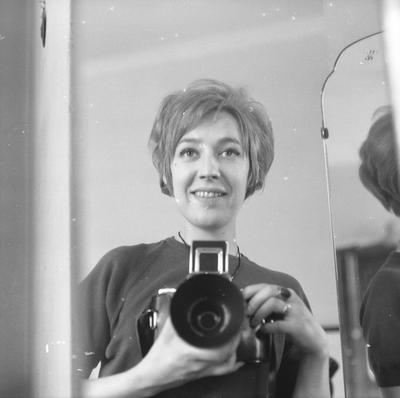
- Self-portrait taken with a Pentacon Six, 1976. From the collections of the NAC.
- Born: Grażyna Wanda Rutowska; May 1, 1946; Bytom, Silesian Voivodeship, Republic of Poland
- Died: December 8, 2002 (aged 56); Gniezno, Greater Poland Voivodeship, Third Polish Republic
- Education: University of Warsaw
- Occupation: Photojournalist
- Years active: 1968–1988
- Era: 20th century
- Employer: Dziennik Ludowy
- Political party: ZSL
- Movement: Agrarian socialism
- Parents: Tadeusz Rutowski (father); Stanisława née Kadulska (mother)

Grażyna Rutowska (Polish pronunciation: [ɡraˈʐɨna ruˈtɔfska]; 1 May 1946 – 8 December 2002) was a Silesian-born photographer, journalist, and activist of the United People's Party (ZSL). She has been regarded as a pioneering street photographer of the Polish People's Republic (PRL), with her images reflecting the modernism and hope of post-war reconstruction.

== Biography ==
=== Early life ===
Rutowska was born in Bytom, Silesian Voivodeship on May Day 1946 to Stanisława (née Kadulska) and Tadeusz Rutowski. Her father was a miner who had become director of the Dymitrov mine in Bytom. In 1952 the family moved to Warsaw where Rutowski had gained a job as a director of a department of the Council of State. In Warsaw Rutowska became interested in photography through attending classes at the Palace of Culture and Science. After finishing school, she unsuccessfully applied to higher education institutes, including the Łódź Film School, eventually gaining a place at the University of Warsaw.

=== Career ===
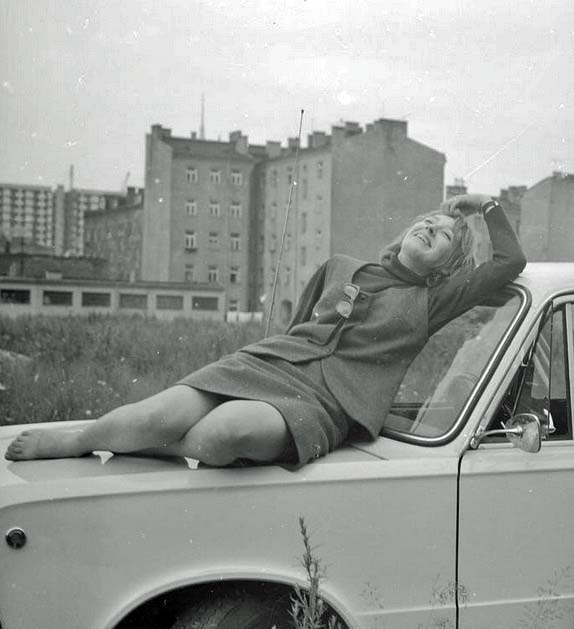
Portrait of Rutowska reclining on the bonnet of her Polski Fiat 125p, 1971

After the death of Rutowska's father in 1969, she took up work as a freelance journalist contributing to several publications between 1966 and 1968. Between 1968 and 1982 Rutowska worked for the ZSL's press publication. In 1982 she was appointed to the position of a senior editor at Dziennik Ludowy. Working as the publication's photojournalist, she travelled 400,000 km by automobile until her health began to decline. Thereafter, she again took up freelance work for various publications including Polska Zbrojna, amongst others. However, her health further declined, and she was forced to sell off her belongings, including her Fiat 125p, and abandoned her photographic work.

=== Retirement ===
In the 1990s, Rutowska moved to the Greater Poland town of Gniezno, where she largely fell into obscurity. During this period, many of her photographs depicted the interior of her flat and views from its window. In 1998 Rutowska donated her personal collection to the Archives of Audiovisual Records, which would later become a key collection of the National Digital Archives (NAC). Rutowska died in Gniezno in 2002.

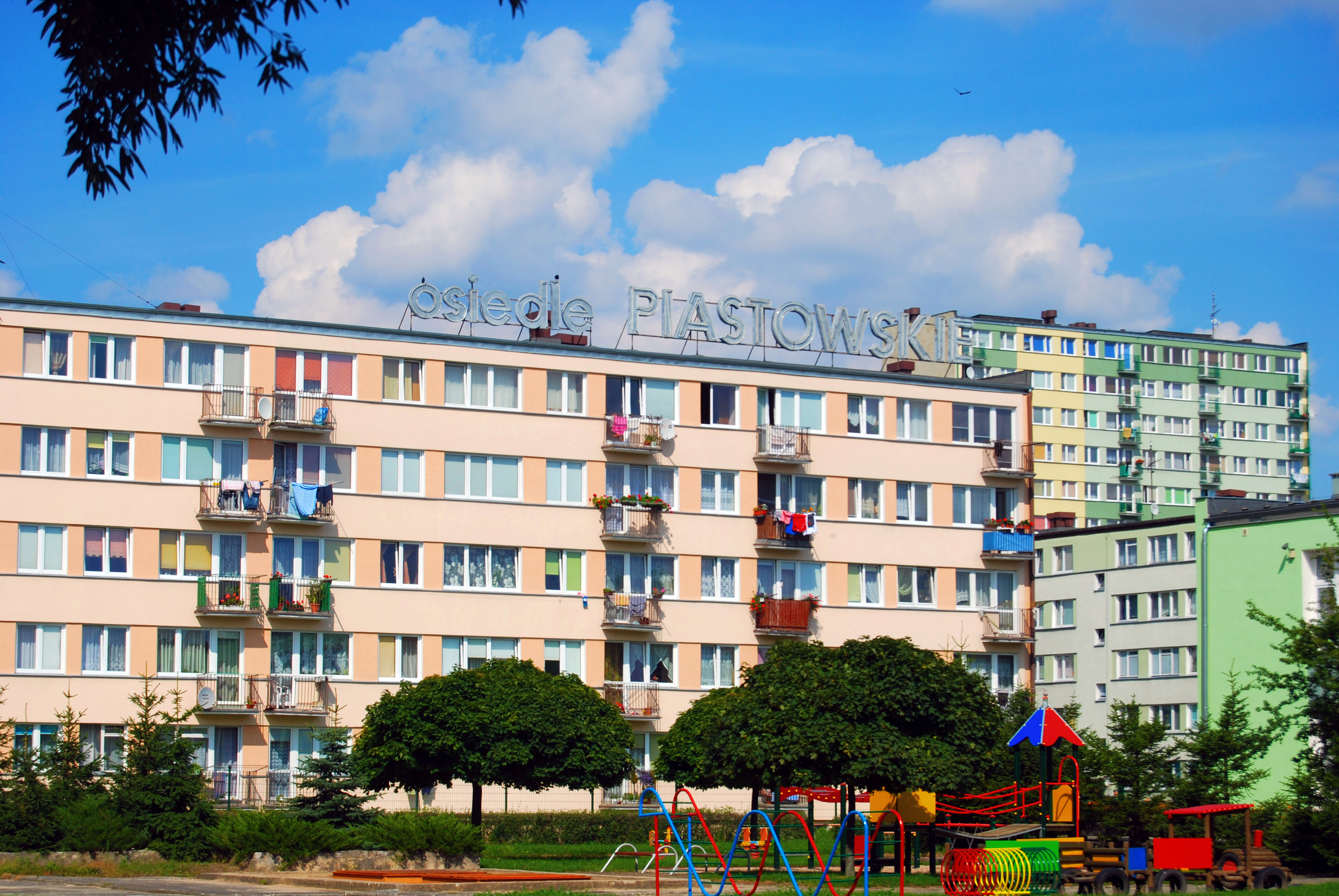
The osiedle in Gniezno where Rutowska spent the end of her life

== Legacy ==
Following her death, the remaining part of Rutowska's ouevre, from 1998 to 2002, was archived at the NAC. The collection consists of over 38,000 photographs which have subsequently been reproduced in three publications of her work.
