= 1st district =

1st district may refer to:

== Australia ==
- 1st Military District (Australia)

== Austria ==
- Innere Stadt, the first district in the city of Vienna
- Innere Stadt (Graz), the first district in the city of Graz

== Hungary ==
- Várkerület, the 1st district of Budapest

== Japan ==
- Aichi 1st district
- Akita 1st district
- Aomori 1st district
- Chiba 1st district
- Ehime 1st district
- Fukui 1st district
- Fukuoka 1st district
- Gifu 1st district
- Gunma 1st district
- Hiroshima 1st district
- Hokkaido 1st district
- Hyogo 1st district
- Ibaraki 1st district
- Ishikawa 1st district
- Iwate 1st district
- Kagawa 1st district
- Kagoshima 1st district
- Kanagawa 1st district
- Kochi 1st district
- Kumamoto 1st district
- Kyoto 1st district
- Mie 1st district
- Miyagi 1st district
- Miyazaki 1st district
- Nagano 1st district
- Nagasaki 1st district
- Nara 1st district
- Niigata 1st district
- Oita 1st district
- Okayama 1st district
- Okinawa 1st district
- Osaka 1st district
- Saga 1st district
- Saitama 1st district
- Shiga 1st district
- Shimane 1st district
- Shizuoka 1st district
- Tochigi 1st district
- Tokushima 1st district
- Tokyo 1st district
- Tottori 1st district
- Toyama 1st district
- Wakayama 1st district
- Yamagata 1st district
- Yamaguchi 1st district
- Yamanashi 1st district

== Poland ==
- District of Opolian Silesia (1st district)

== United States ==
- Alabama's 1st congressional district
- Arizona's 1st congressional district
- Arkansas's 1st congressional district
- California's 1st congressional district
- Colorado's 1st congressional district
- Connecticut's 1st congressional district
- Florida's 1st congressional district
- Georgia's 1st congressional district
- Hawaii's 1st congressional district
- Idaho's 1st congressional district
- Illinois's 1st congressional district
- Indiana's 1st congressional district
- Iowa's 1st congressional district
- Kansas's 1st congressional district
- Kentucky's 1st congressional district
- Louisiana's 1st congressional district
- Maine's 1st congressional district
- Maryland's 1st congressional district
- Massachusetts's 1st congressional district
- Michigan's 1st congressional district
- Minnesota's 1st congressional district
- Mississippi's 1st congressional district
- Missouri's 1st congressional district
- Montana's 1st congressional district (from 2023)
- Nebraska's 1st congressional district
- Nevada's 1st congressional district
- New Hampshire's 1st congressional district
- New Jersey's 1st congressional district
- New Mexico's 1st congressional district
- New York's 1st congressional district
- North Carolina's 1st congressional district
- Ohio's 1st congressional district
- Oklahoma's 1st congressional district
- Oregon's 1st congressional district
- Pennsylvania's 1st congressional district
- Rhode Island's 1st congressional district
- South Carolina's 1st congressional district
- Tennessee's 1st congressional district
- Texas's 1st congressional district
- Utah's 1st congressional district
- Virginia's 1st congressional district
- Washington's 1st congressional district
- West Virginia's 1st congressional district
- Wisconsin's 1st congressional district

== See also ==
- 1st arrondissement
