= Moszna, Opole Voivodeship =

Moszna Moschen
- Village
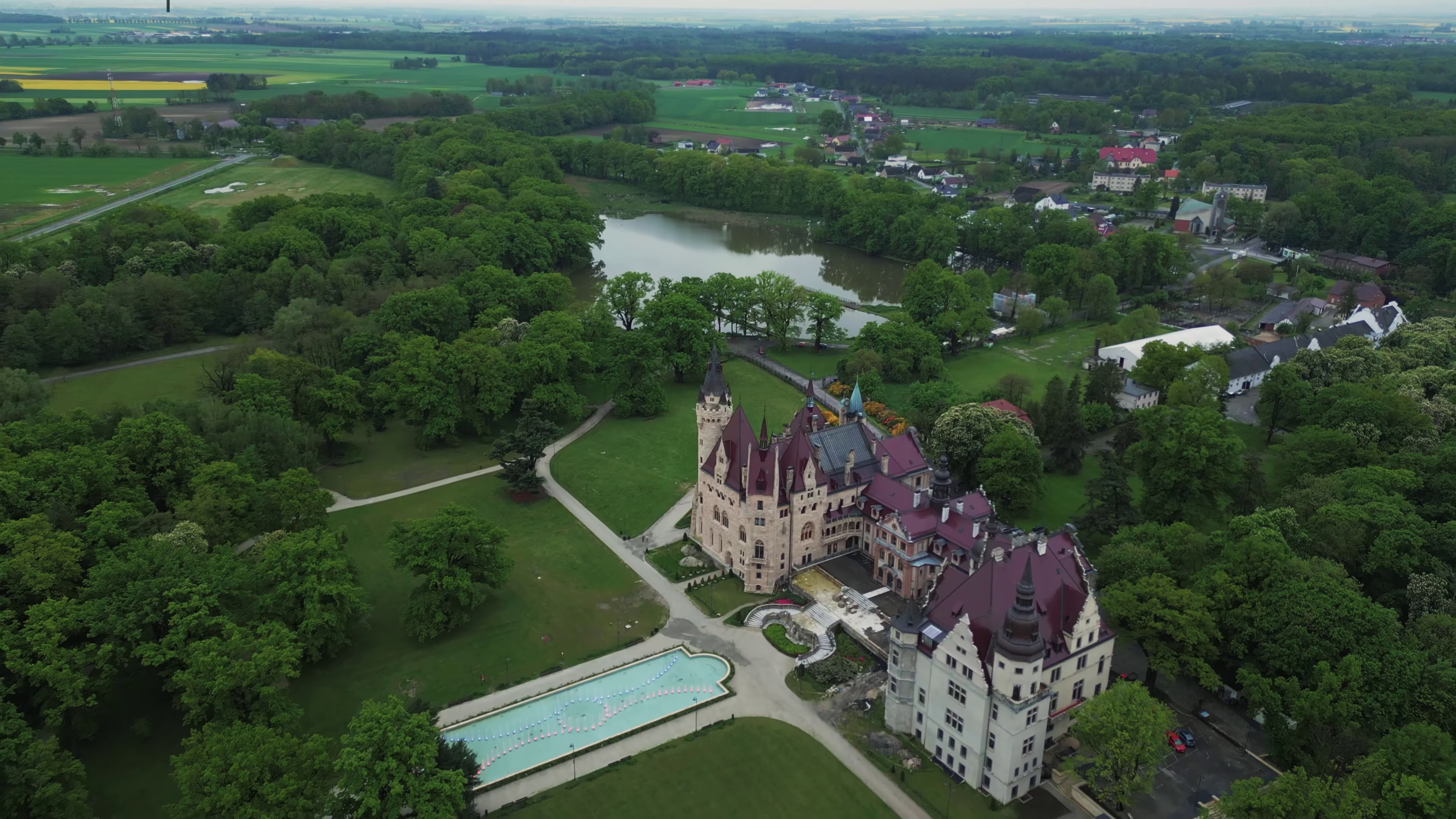
- Moszna Castle and the surroundings

- Location within Poland
- Coordinates: 50°26′N 17°46′E
- Country: Poland
- Voivodeship: Opole
- County: Krapkowice
- Gmina: Strzeleczki
- First mentioned: 1650

Population (2021)
  - Total: 349
- Time zone: UTC+1 (CET)
  - Summer (DST): UTC+2
- Postal code: 47-370
- Area code: +4877
- Vehicle registration: OKR

Moszna ([ˈmɔʂna], additional name in German: Moschen) is a village in the administrative district of Gmina Strzeleczki, within Krapkowice County, Opole Voivodeship, southern Poland. It is situated in the historical region of Prudnik Land. It lies approximately 20 km (12 mi) north-east of Prudnik, and 30 km (19 mi) south of the regional capital, Opole.

As of 31 December 2021, the village's population numbered 349 inhabitants. A significant portion of them belongs to the German minority in Poland.

== Geography ==
The village is located in the southern part of Opole Voivodeship, close to the Czech Republic–Poland border. It is situated in the historical Prudnik Land region, as well as in Upper Silesia. It lies in the Silesian Lowlands, in the valley of Nowoprudnicki brook. The sołectwo of Moszna has an area of 729 hectares (1,800 acres).

=== Integral parts ===
According to the National Register of Geographical Names for 2025, the village of Moszna had 1 integral part, classified as a hamlet (przysiółek): Urszulanowice.

== Etymology ==
The name Moszna came from a Polish word moszna (meaning bag or depression). The village was known as Moschen in German.

Following the Second World War, Polish names Mośna and Moszynice were used. The name Moszna was introduced by the Commission for the Determination of Place Names on 9 September 1947. As Gmina Strzeleczki gained the bilingual status on 24 November 2008, the government introduced an additional German name for the village: Moschen

In the Prudnik dialect, the village is known under the same name as in Polish—Moszna. However, it is declined differently, for example: w Mosznie in Prudnik instead of w Mosznej in Polish.

== History ==
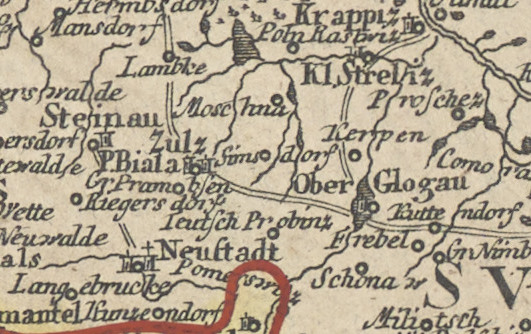
Moschna among other localities of Prudnik Land on an 1747 map

Traces of human presence in the area of the present-day village of Moszna, confirmed by archaeological research, date back to prehistory. Reimains of a wooden construction from the Middle Ages period were found at the site of the Moszna Castle. A theory claiming that Moszna belonged to the Knights Templar in the Middle Ages has not been confirmed by historical documents. According to the Book of Henryków, in either 1309 or 1310, a family named Mosce or Moschin settled in the area of present-day Moszna. At the time it was part of medieval Piast-ruled Poland.

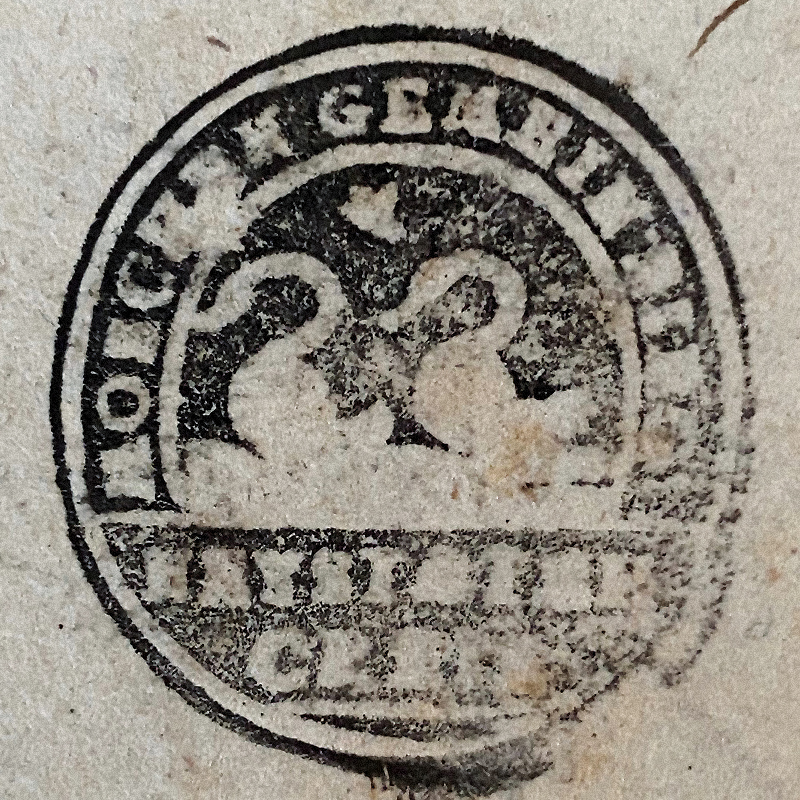
19th-century sigil

The first recorded mention of the village of Moszna was in 1650. Archdeacon of Opole named the owner of Moszna in 1679 as "dominus Skal in Mossna". From 1648 to 1666 it was Polish-ruled under the House of Vasa, and then until 1742, the village was a part of Głogówek County (circulus superioris Glogoviae) in the Bohemian Crown and Habsburg Empire. On a 1736 map of the Duchy of Opole, a symbol meaning either "Villoe" (villa) or "Pagi sine templo" (village without a church) according to the legend, was placed next to the name Moschna. After the death of Ursula Maria von Skall in 1723, the village was owned by Georg Wilhelm von Reisewitz, the Hofmarschall of Frederick the Great. After the First Silesian War, it was annexed by the Kingdom of Prussia was incorporated into Prudnik County (Großkreis Neustadt). In 1771, the Moszna estate was purchased by Heinrich Leopold von Seherr-Thoss, whose family also owned a palace in nearby Dobra.

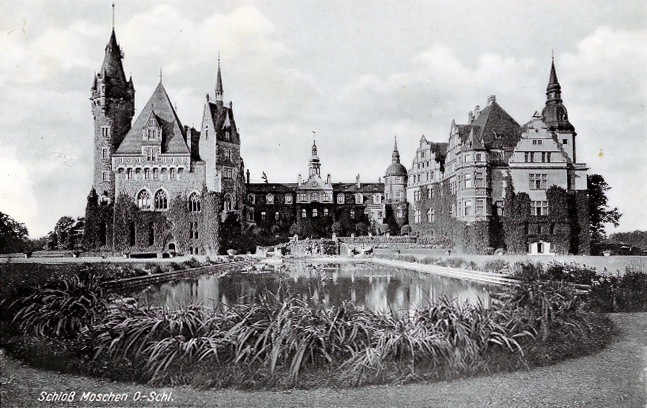
Moszna Castle after reconstruction

In 1853, Karl Gothard von Seherr-Thoss sold Moszna to Heinrich von Erdmansdorf, who in turn sold it to Hubert von Tiele-Winckler in 1866. Moszna, one of the biggest estates of the Prudnik Land, became the main residence of the Tiele-Winckler family. After Hubert's death, the estate was taken over by his son—Franz Hubert von Tiele-Winckler, the Landrat of Prudnik County. The village had its own sigil. In 1895, the Neustadt-Gogoliner Eisenbahn company was established in Prudnik, with an intention of building a railway line from Prudnik to Gogolin, through Moszna. The railway was constructed in 1896. On the night between 2 and 3 June 1896, the Baroque palace in Moszna was destroyed by a fire. In the years that followed, it was reconstructed and expanded into a castle. The forest near Moszna were served as a popular hunting place for people of Prudnik County.

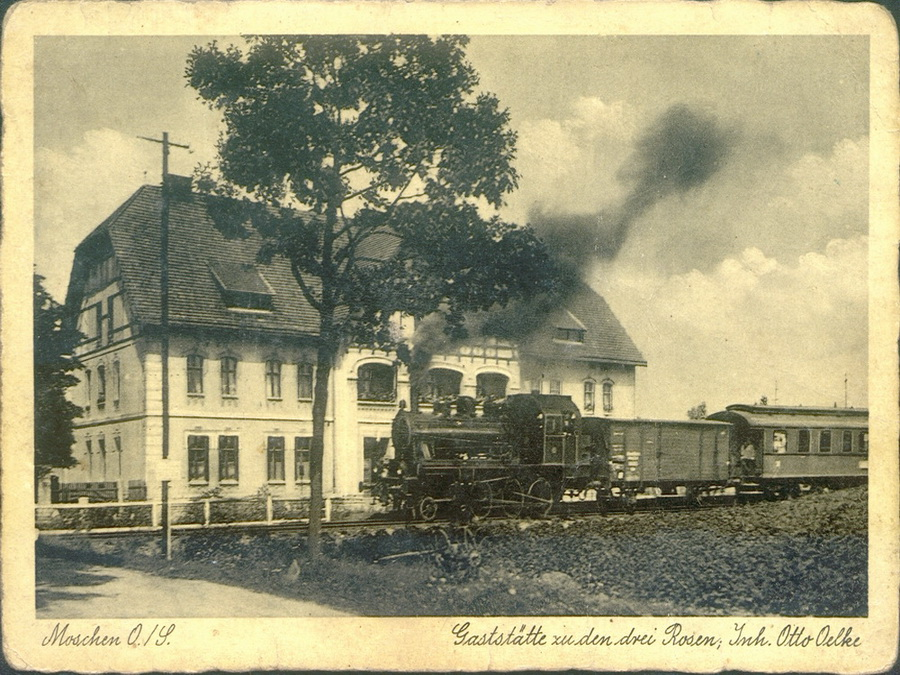
A train departing from Moszna station towards Prudnik

According to the 1 December 1910 census, among 461 inhabitants of Moszna, 134 spoke German, 316 spoke Polish, and 7 were bilingual. Only a portion of Prudnik County participated in the 1921 Upper Silesia plebiscite, which was supposed to determine ownership of the Province of Upper Silesia between Germany and Poland. Moszna found itself in the eastern part of the county, within the plebiscite area. 163 people of Moszna voted to remain in Germany, and 15 voted to reunite with Poland. In the end, the area of Prudnik, along with Biedrzychowice, remained in Germany.

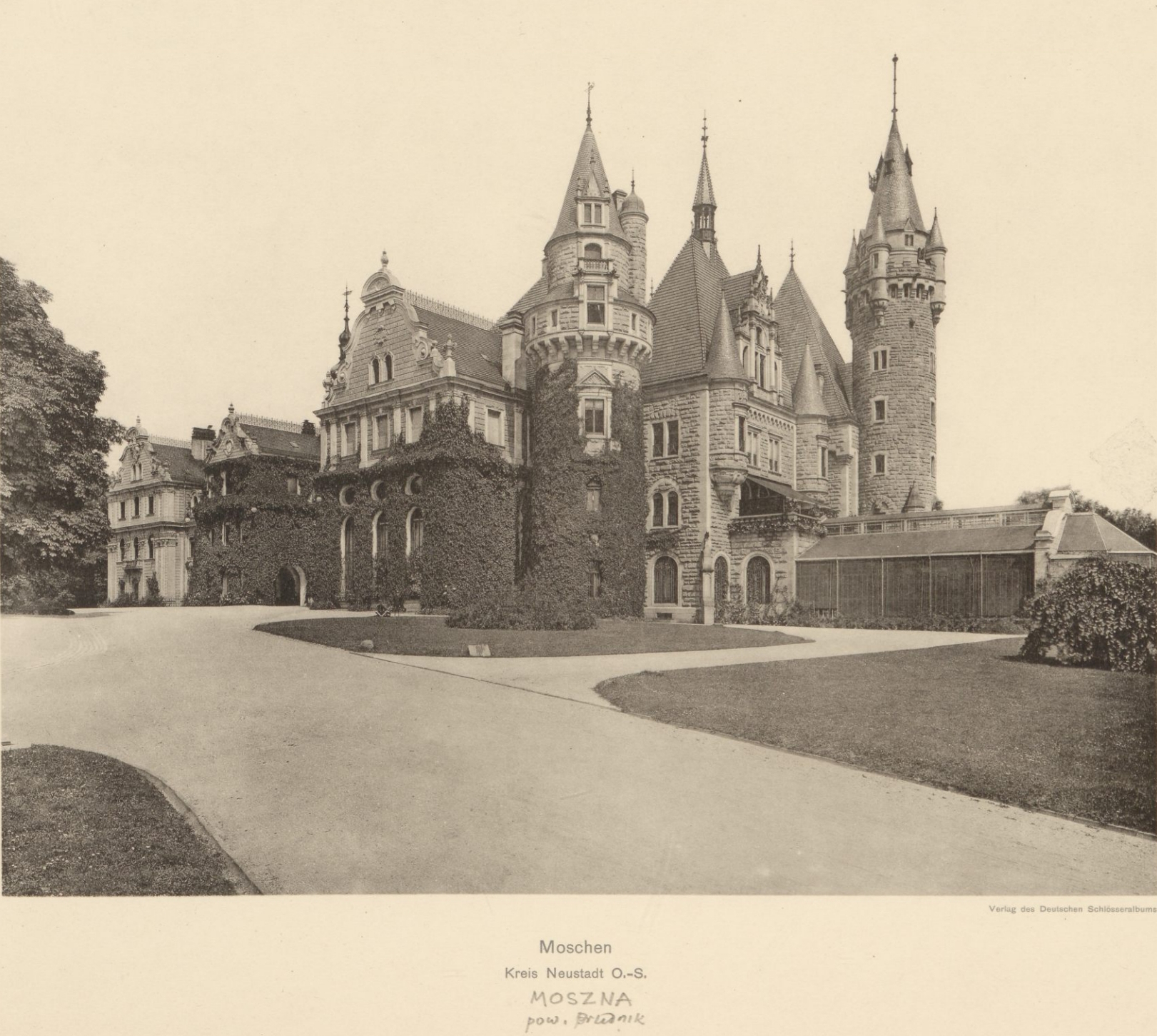
Moszna Castle, 1909

During the Second World War, a subsidiary of the military hospital in Prudnik was established in Moszna. In March 1945, Moszna was one of the localities of Prudnik County that were adapted by the Germans to defend against the Red Army. The village was surrounded by a trench. The Red Army captured Moszna while on its way to Prudnik as part of the Upper Silesian offensive. During the battle of Prudnik in April and May 1945, Soviets temporarily evacuated German and Polish civilians of Prudnik and surrounding villages to Strzeleczki through Moszna. Residents of the village buried a German Feldjägerkorps officer by the castle gate.

Following the Second World War, from March to May 1945, Prudnik County was controlled by the Soviet military commandant's office. On 11 May 1945, it was passed on to the Polish administration. Autochthonous inhabitants of Moszna, who either knew Polish or spoke Silesian, were allowed to remain in the village.

The village became a part of Silesian Voivodeship in 1945. It belongs to Opole Voivodeship since 1950. In the years 1945–1954, the village belonged to Gmina Łącznik in Prudnik County.

A horse breeding farm was founded in Moszna in 1946. It was based on a herd from a liquidated farm in Dłoń, near Rawicz. The farm in Moszna has kept thoroughbred horses from the very beginning and it expanded its husbandry with cross-breeds in 1961. The local Roman Catholic church was constructed in the years 1983–1999.

== Moszna Castle ==
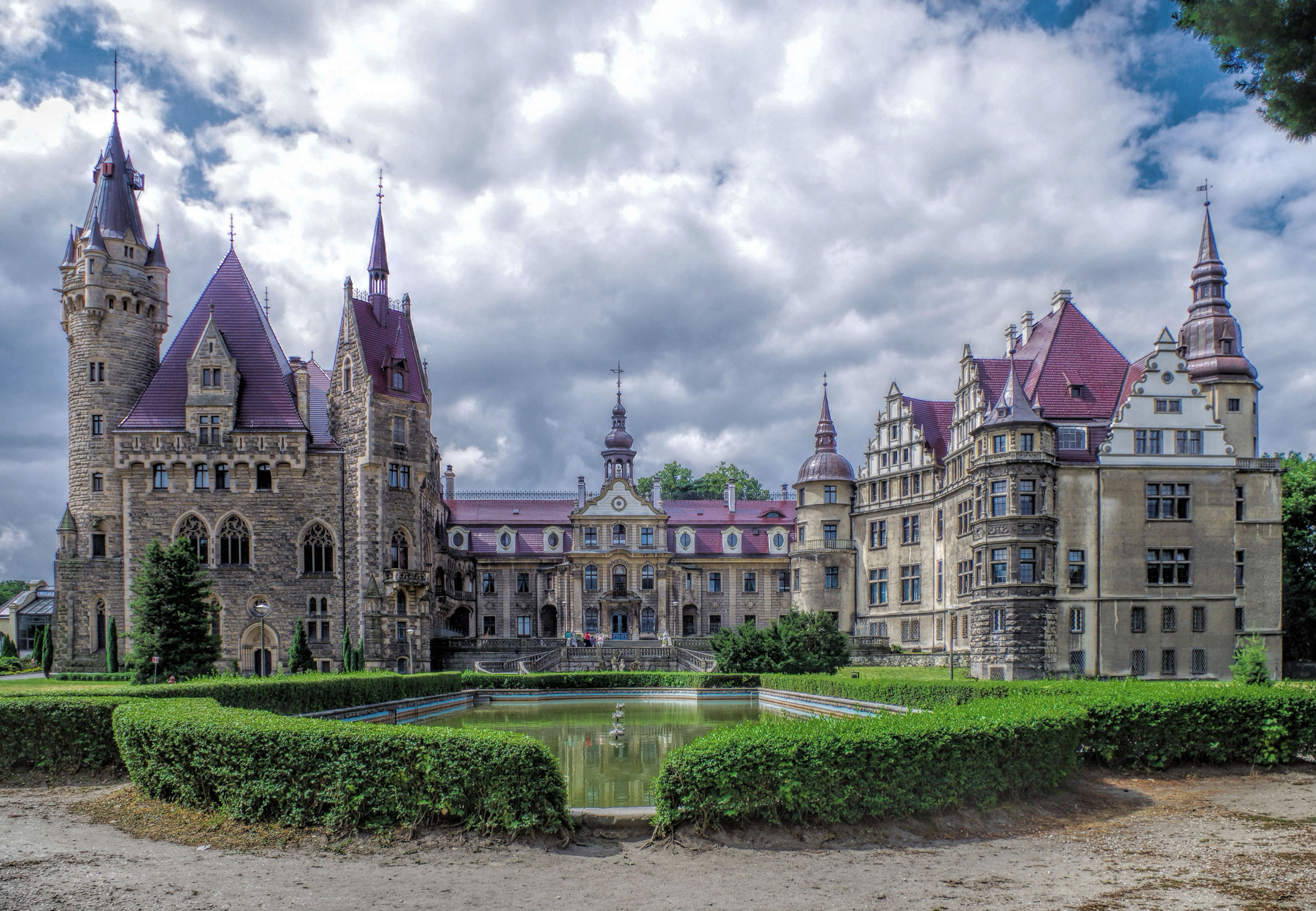
Moszna Castle

The Moszna Castle, located in the village, is a historic castle and palace. It is considered to be the most magnificent residence of Prudnik Land, and is one of the best-known monuments in the western part of Upper Silesia. It has been described as an excellent example of romantic fairy-tale and eclectic architecture.

The history of the residence begins in the 18th century, although traces of older cellars were discovered in the gardens during excavation and reconstruction works. The castle served as the main residence of the Tiele-Winckler family. The central part of the castle is a Baroque palace, partially destroyed by a fire in 1896. The residence was reconstructed and expanded in neo-Gothic and neo-Renaissance styles by Franz Hubert von Tiele-Winckler, the Landrat of Prudnik County. After World War II, the castle housed various institutions until 1972 when it became a convalescent home. Later it became a Public Health Care Centre for Therapies of Neuroses. Nowadays, it is a popular tourist destination.

The whole castle has exactly ninety-nine turrets. Inside, it contains 365 rooms with a total floorage of 7,000 sq. m. and a cubic capacity of about 65,000 m^{3} The castle complex includes a park.

== Demographics ==
Moszna is inhabited by Poles, Silesians and Germans belonging to the registered German minority in Poland. The residents speak the Prudnik dialect of the Silesian language. The village gained the bilingual Polish-German status in 2008.

== Transport ==
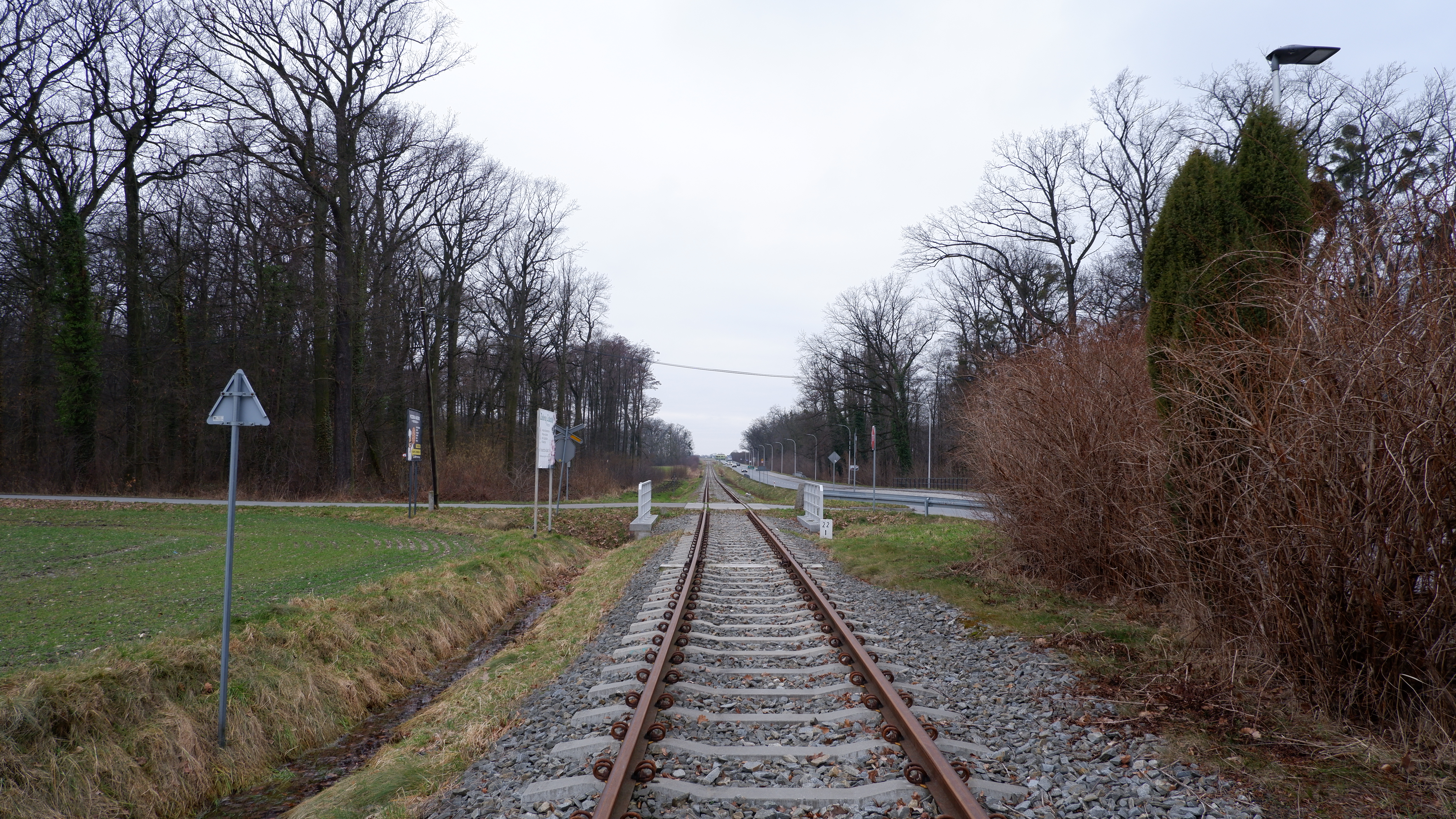
Railway tracks in Moszna

The Krapkowice–Prudnik railway (rail line number 306), used only for freight and tourist traffic, runs through Moszna. The village used to have a railway stop. The closest active railway station is located in Prudnik. Voivodeship road 409 also runs through the village. A bike path from Prudnik to Zielina runs through Moszna.

The local public transport buses were operated by PKS Prudnik. Since 2021, public transit is organized by the PGZT "Pogranicze" corporation in Prudnik.

== Bibliography ==
- Lesiuk, Wiesław (1978). Ziemia Prudnicka. Dzieje, gospodarka, kultura. Urząd Miasta i Gminy w Prudniku, Wydawnictwo Instytutu Śląskiego w Opolu. OCLC 251643861.
- Cichoń-Bitka, Maria (1987). "Historia zamku w Mosznej". Opolski Informator Konserwatorski. 4. Opole: WOINTE.
- Hellfeier, Robert (2014). Smolarnia – 350 lat historii (PDF). Smolarnia: Gmina Strzeleczki. ISBN 978-83-63233-26-6.
- Kasza, Ryszard (2018). Powiat prudnicki – historia dawną fotografią pisana. Prudnik: Powiat Prudnicki. ISBN 978-83-931068-0-6.
- Kasza, Ryszard (2020). Ulicami Prudnika z historią i fotografią w tle. Prudnik: Powiat Prudnicki. ISBN 978-83-954314-5-6.
