= 1st arrondissement =

1st arrondissement may refer to:

== France ==
- 1st arrondissement of Lyon
- 1st arrondissement of Marseille
- 1st arrondissement of Paris

== Benin ==
- 1st arrondissement of Parakou
- 1st arrondissement of Porto-Novo
- 1st arrondissement of the Littoral Department
