= Urszulanowice =

Urszulanowice Ursulanowitz
- Village
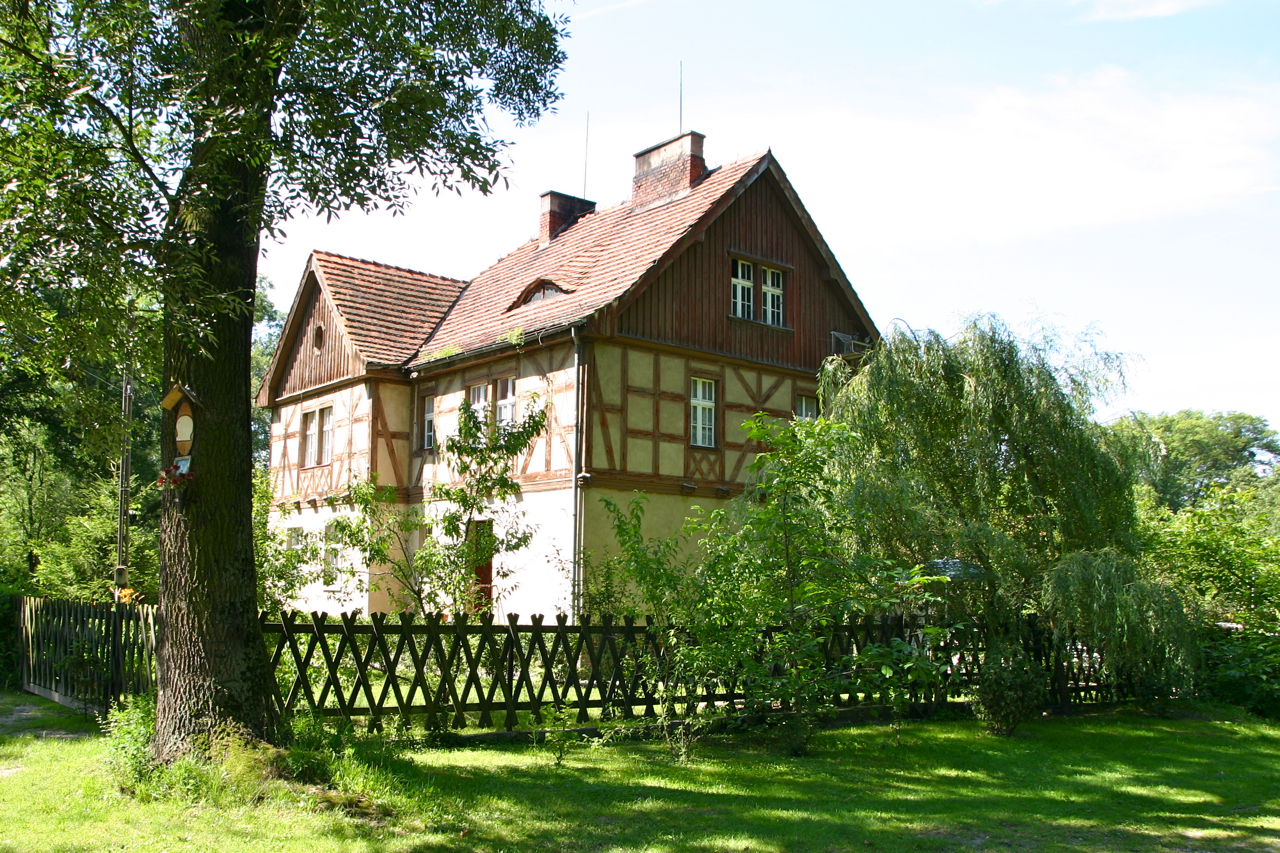

- Location within Poland
- Coordinates: 50°25′37″N 17°45′38″E
- Country: Poland
- Voivodeship: Opole
- County: Krapkowice
- Gmina: Strzeleczki

Population
  - Total: 6
- Time zone: UTC+1 (CET)
  - Summer (DST): UTC+2 (CEST)
- Vehicle registration: OKR

Urszulanowice ([urʂulanɔˈvit͡sɛ], additional name in German: Ursulanowitz) is a village in the administrative district of Gmina Strzeleczki, within Krapkowice County, Opole Voivodeship, in Upper Silesia in southern Poland.

The village is administered as part of the village of Moszna.

Since 2006 the village, like the entire commune, has been bilingual in Polish and German.

== See also ==
- Prudnik Land
