= Moszna Castle =

Coordinates: 50°26′N 17°46′E

Moszna Castle Pałac w Mosznej
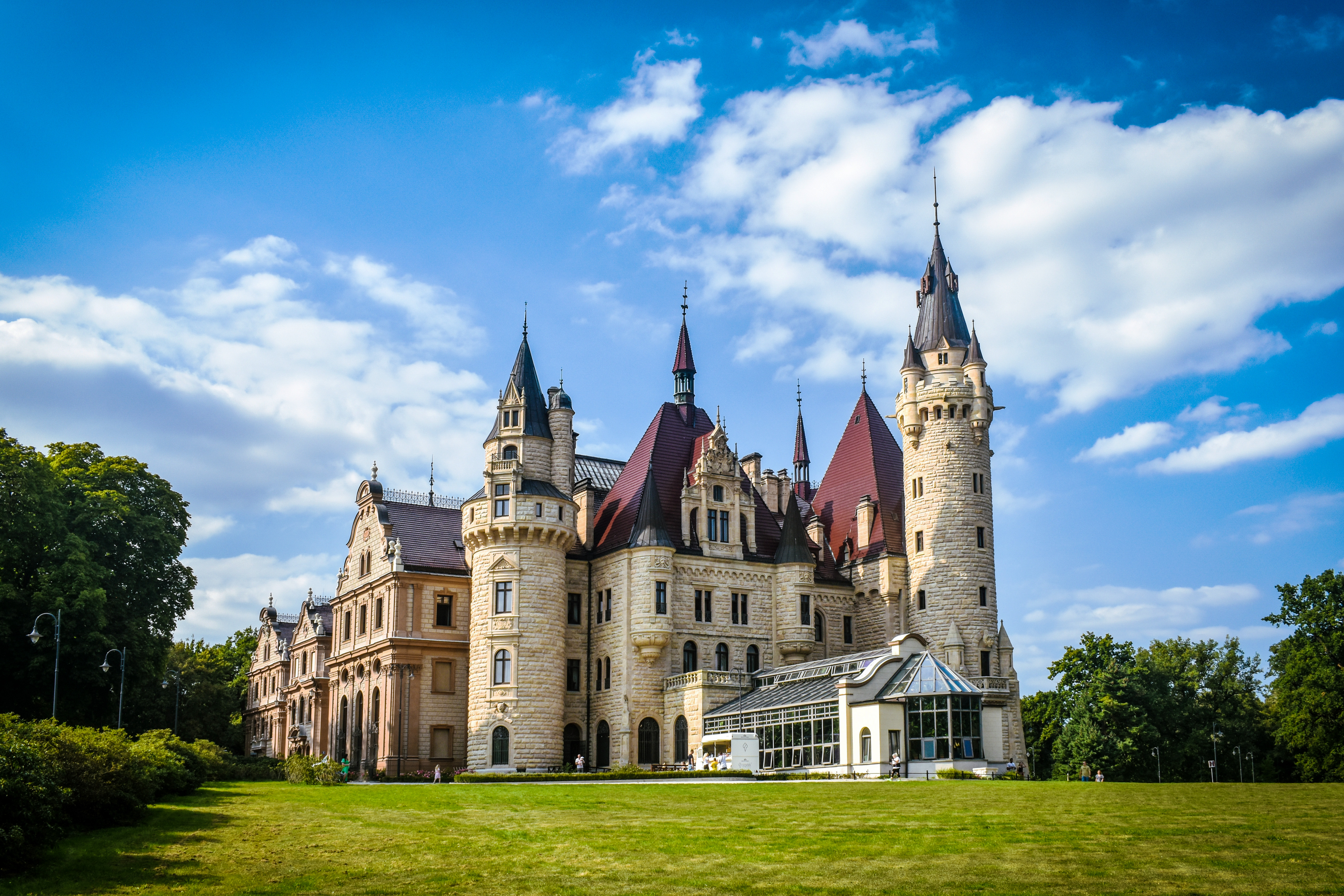
- Interactive map of the Moszna Castle; Pałac w Mosznej area

General information
- Architectural style: Eclecticism; Neo-Gothic, Neo-Baroque and Neo-Renaissance
- Location: Moszna, Opole, Poland
- Completed: 1768 (initial); 1896–1914 (current)

Website
- Official Website (Polish)

The Moszna Castle (Silesian: Palast Moszna, Polish: Pałac w Mosznej, German: Schloss Moschen) is a historic castle and palace located in the small village of Moszna, in southwestern Poland. Situated approximately 30 kilometres (19 mi) south of the regional capital Opole, between the towns of Prudnik and Krapkowice, the residence is an excellent example of romantic fairy-tale and eclectic architecture.

The history of this building begins in the 18th century, although traces of older cellars were discovered in the gardens during excavation and reconstruction works at the beginning of the 20th century. Some of those could have been remnants of a presumed Templar stronghold. Following the Second World War, further excavations uncovered a medieval palisade.

== History ==
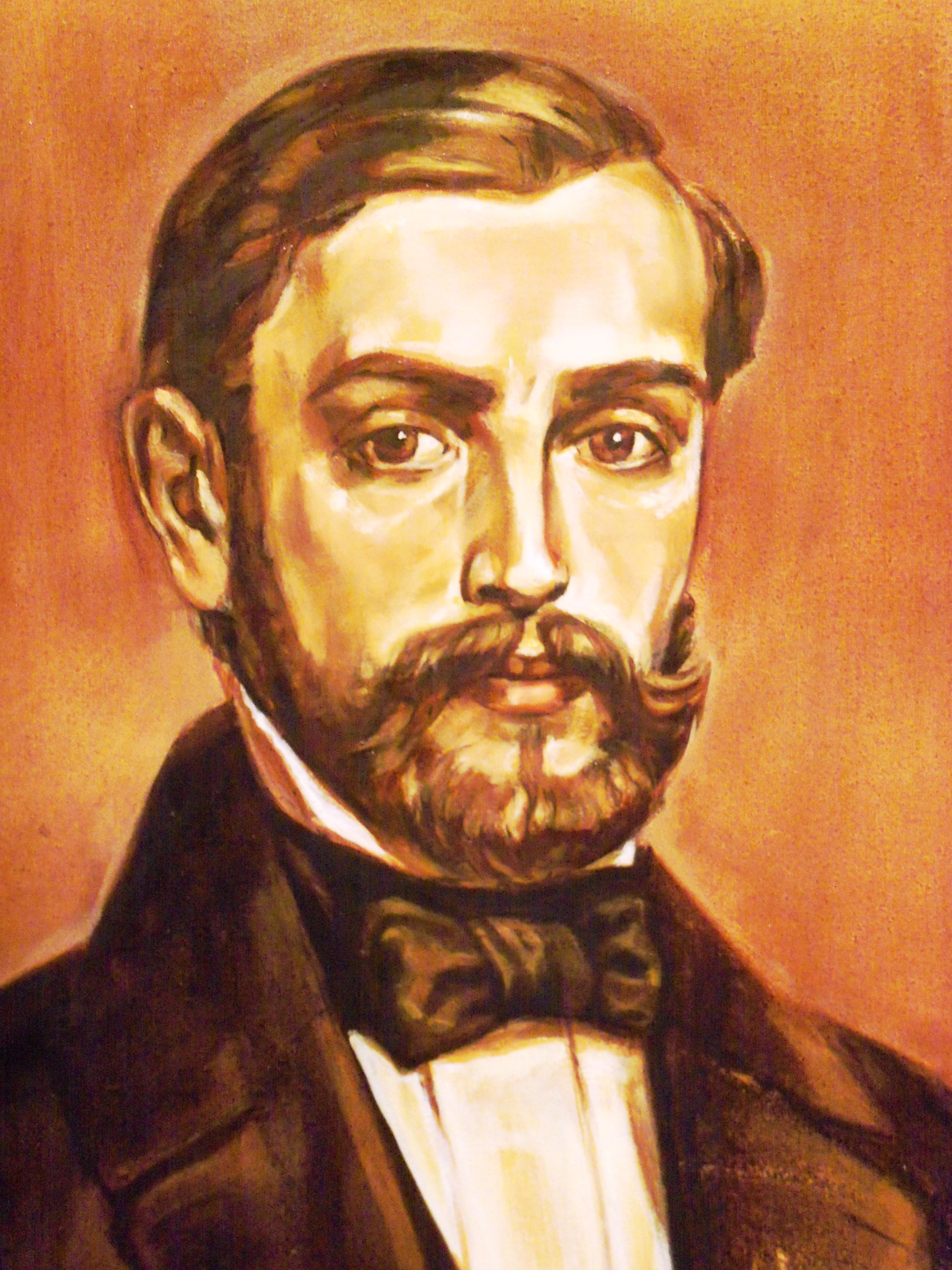
Portrait of Hubert von Tiele-Winckler, unknown author, History museum of Katowice

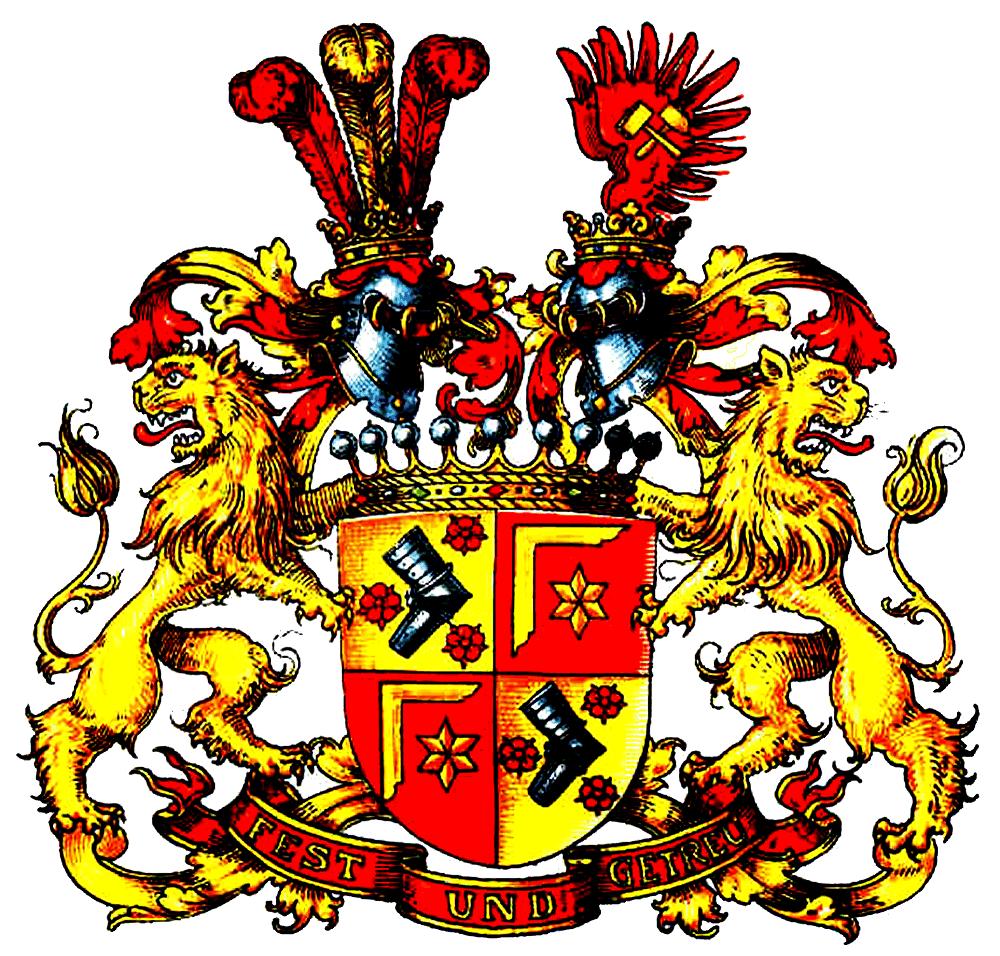
Coat of arms of the Counts von Tiele-Winckler

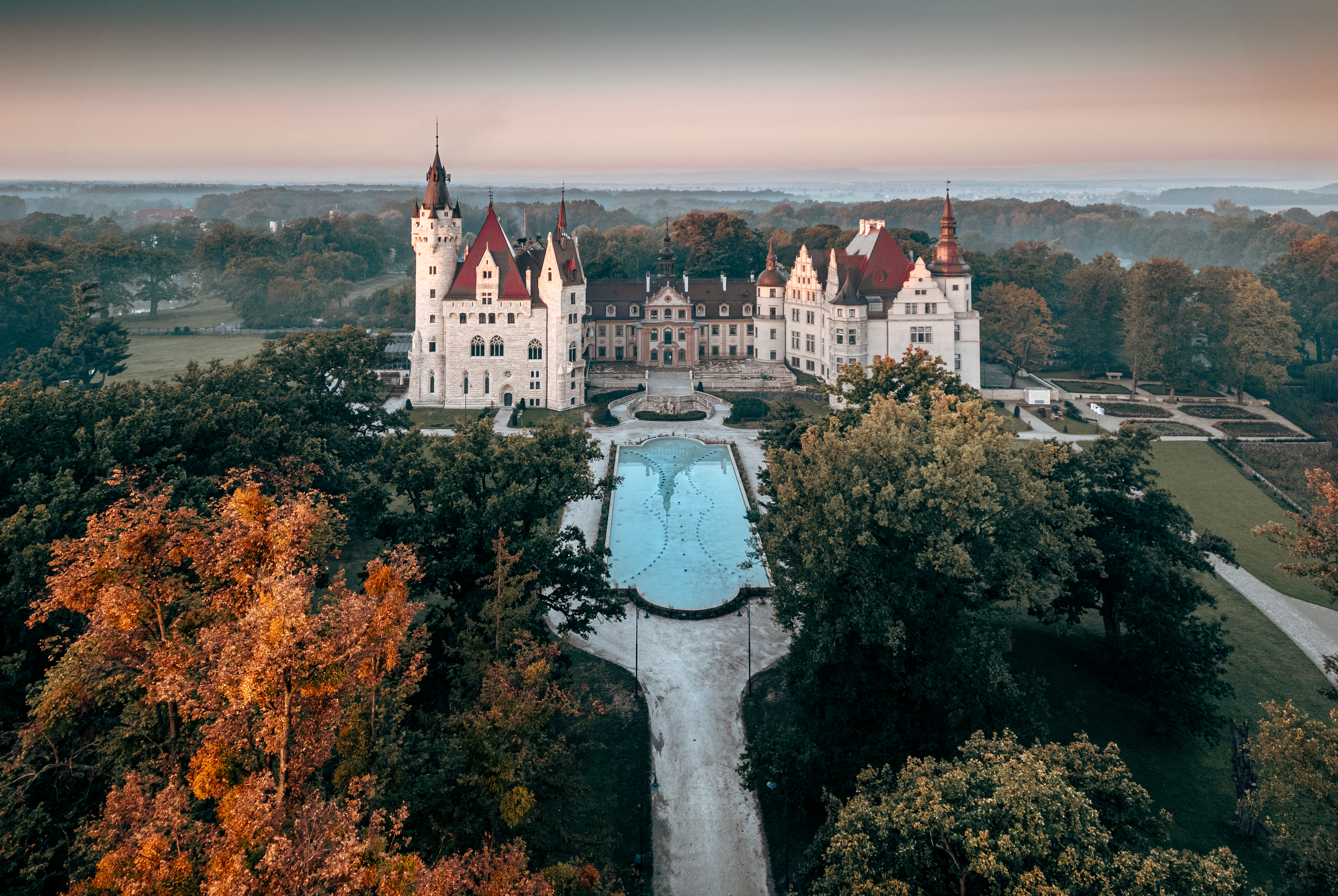
Frontal facade featuring neobaroque architectural styles

The central part of the castle is an old baroque palace which was partially destroyed by fire on the night of April 2, 1896 and was reconstructed in the same year in its original form by Franz Hubert von Tiele-Winckler (the son of Hubert von Tiele-Winckler). The reconstruction works involved an extension of the residence. The eastern Neogothic-styled wing of the building was built by 1900, along with an adjacent orangery. In 1912–1914, the western wing was built in the Neo-Renaissance style. The architectural form of the castle contains a wide variety of styles, thus it can be generally defined as eclectic. The height of the building, as well as its numerous turrets and spires, give the impression of verticalism.

The whole castle has exactly ninety-nine turrets. Inside, it contains 365 rooms with a total floorage of 7,000 sq. m. and a cubic capacity of about 65,000 m^{3} The castle was twice visited by the German Emperor Wilhelm II. His participation in hunting during his stay at the castle was documented in a hand-written chronicle in 1911 as well as in the following year.

The castle in Moszna was the residence of a Silesian Tiele-Winckler family, who were industrial magnates, from 1866 until the spring of 1945 when they were forced to flee to what remained of Germany west of the Oder–Neisse line when the castle was temporarily occupied by the Soviet Red Army and this part of Silesia was placed under Polish jurisdiction by the victorious allies, with the remaining German population subsequently expelled. The short period of Soviet control caused significant damage to the castle's internal fittings in comparison to the minor damage caused by the Second World War.

After World War II the castle did not have a permanent owner and was the home of various institutions until 1972 when it became a convalescent home. Later it became a Public Health Care Centre for Therapies of Neuroses. Nowadays it can be visited by tourists since the health institution has moved to another building in the neighbourhood. The castle also has a chapel which is used as a concert hall. Since 1998 the castle has housed a gallery in which works of various artists are presented at regular exhibitions.

Apart from the castle itself, the entire complex includes a park which has no precise boundaries and includes nearby fields, meadows and a forest. Only the main axis of the park can be characterised as geometrical. Starting from the gate, it leads along the oak and then horse-chestnut avenues, towards the castle. Further on, the park passes into an avenue of lime trees with symmetrical canals running along both sides of the path, lined with a few varieties of rhododendrons. The axis of the park terminates at the base of a former monument of Hubert von Tiele-Winckler. On the eastern side of the avenue there is a pond with an islet referred to by the owners as Easter Island. The islet is planted with needle-leaved shrubs and can be reached by a Chinese-styled bridge. The garden, as part of the whole park complex was restored slightly earlier than the castle itself. Preserved documents of 1868 state that the improvement in the garden's aesthetic quality was undertaken by Hubert von Tiele-Winckler.

== Gallery ==
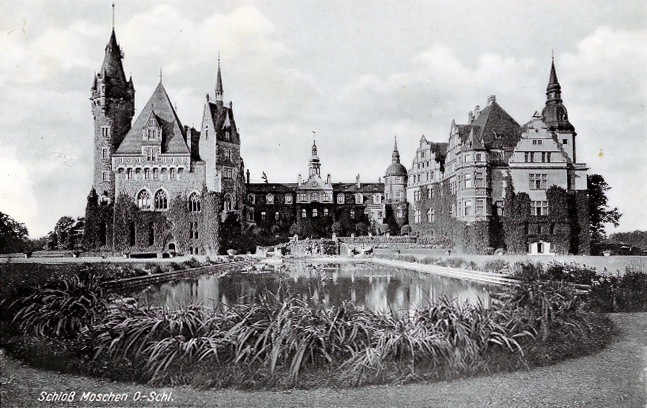
Historic view, "Schloss Moschen" is the German name

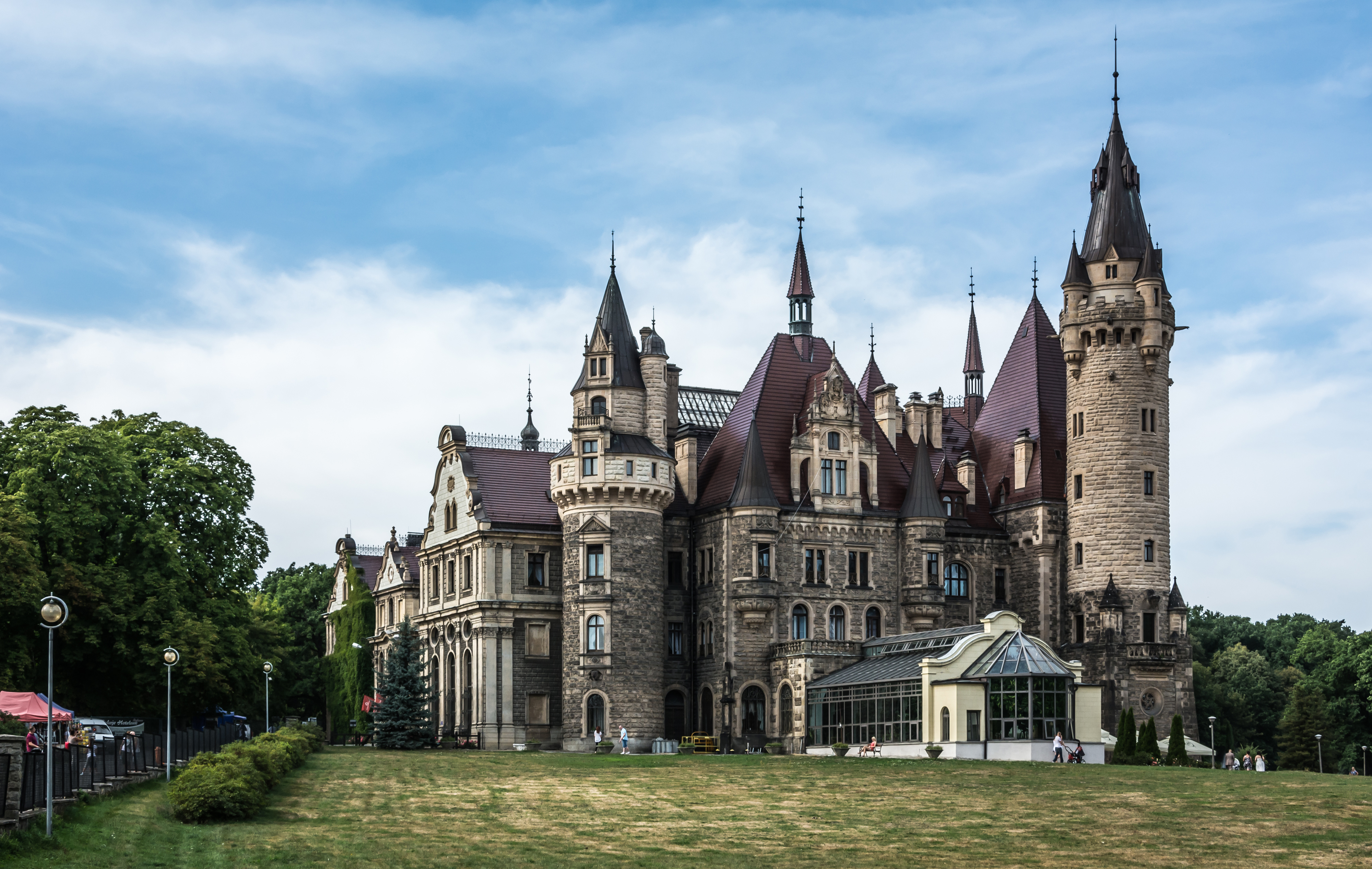
Moszna Castle with an adjoining hothouse before cleaning

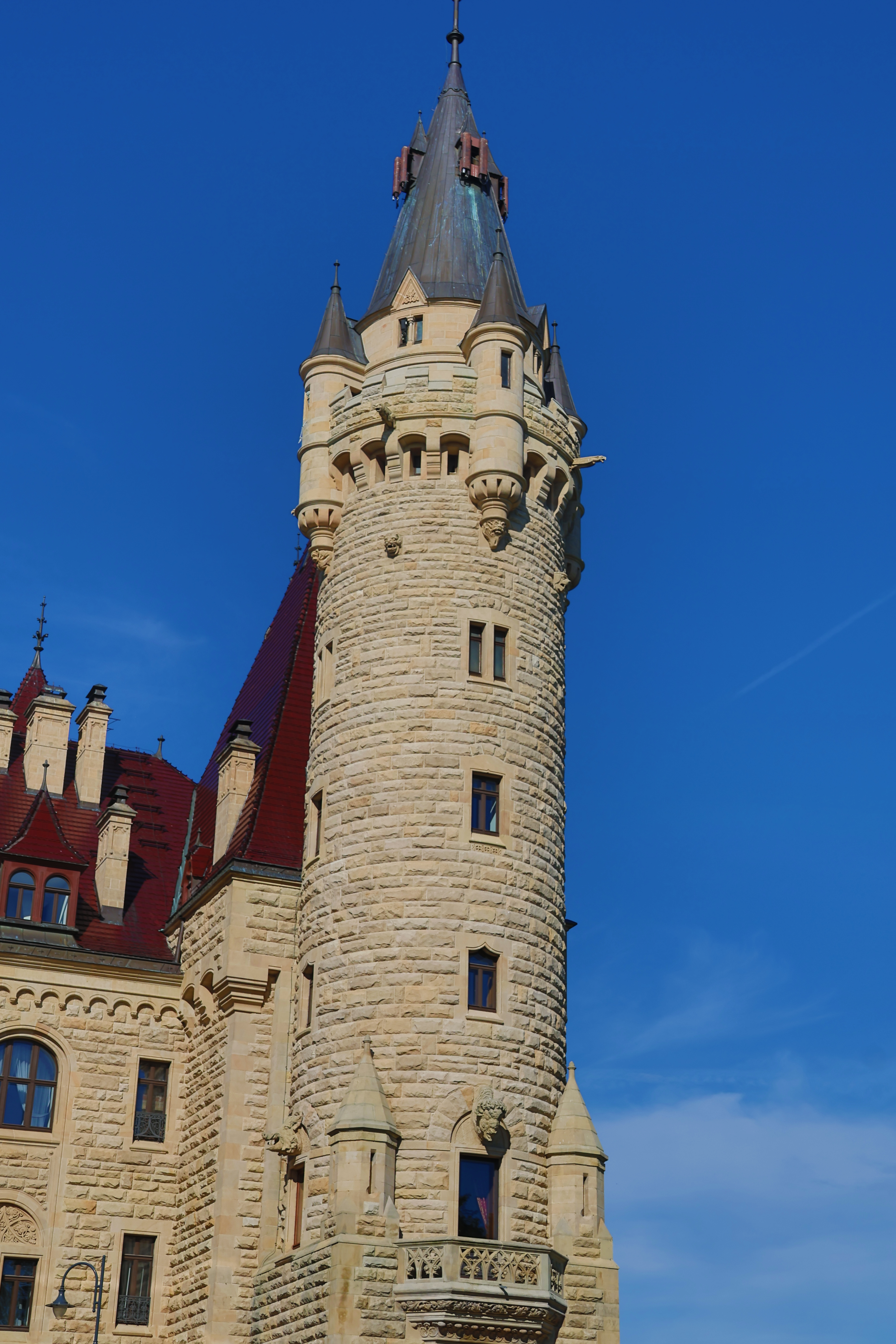
One of the castle's iconic towers

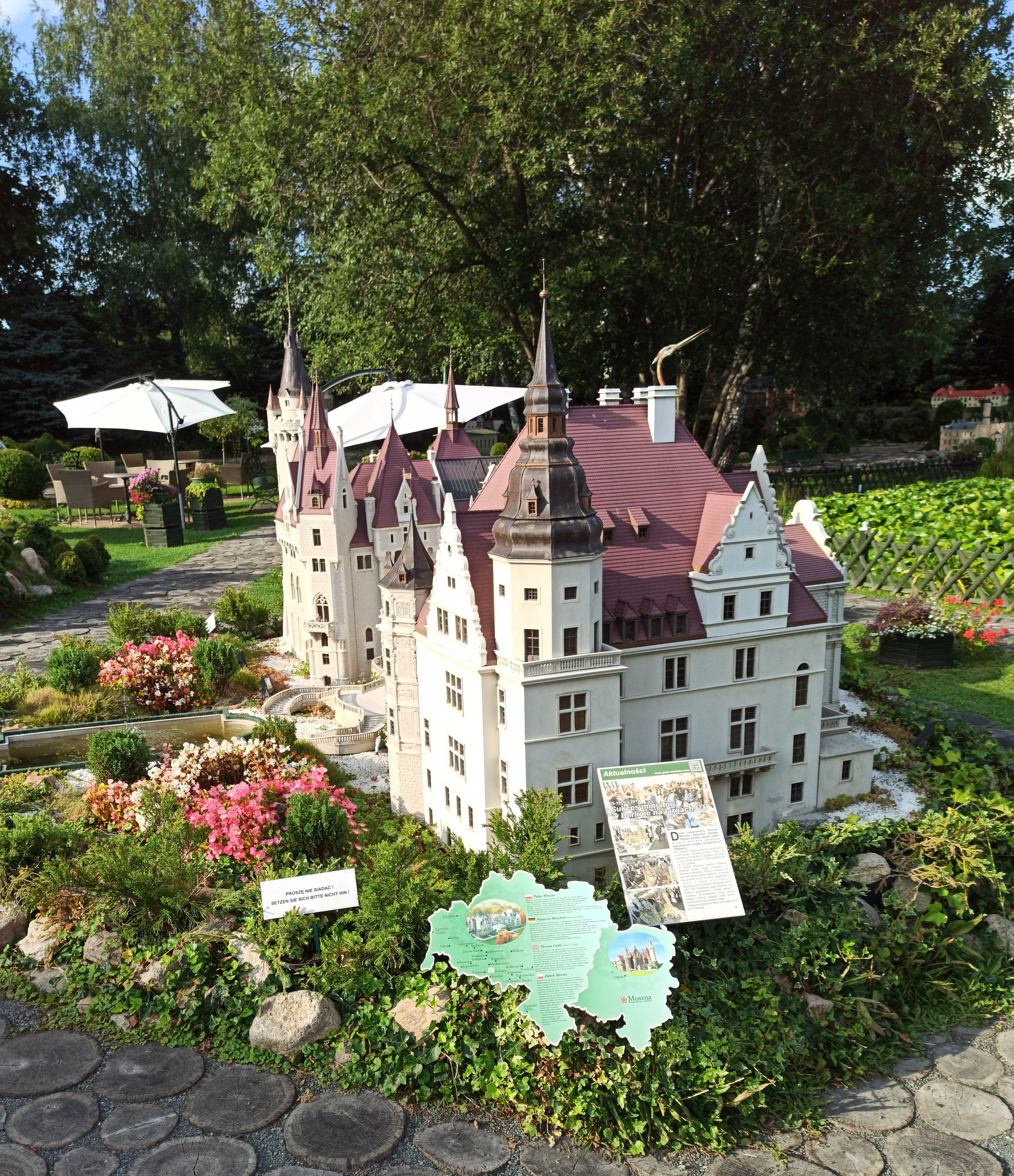
A miniature model of the castle at Kowary

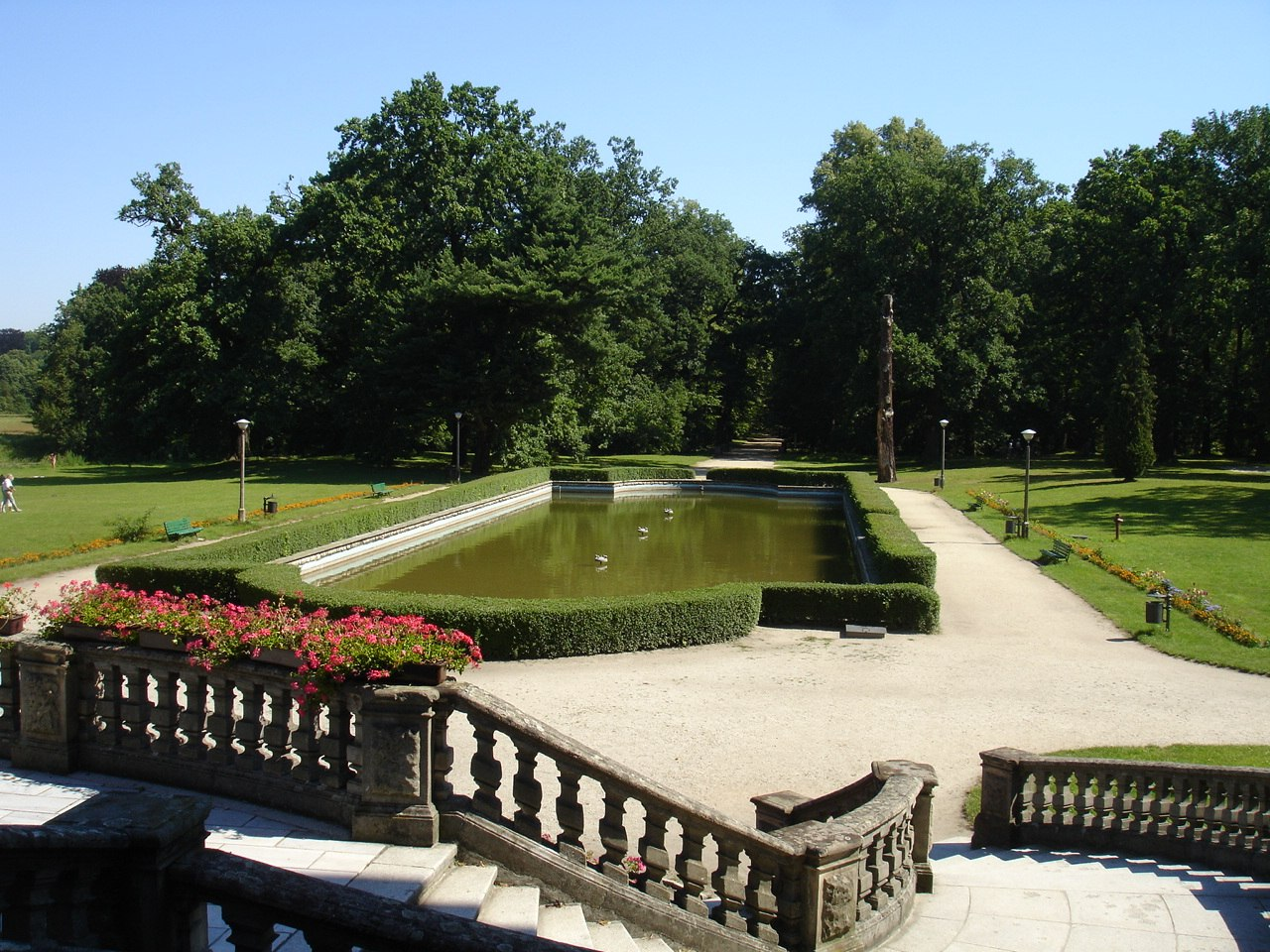
A pond located in the garden of the castle

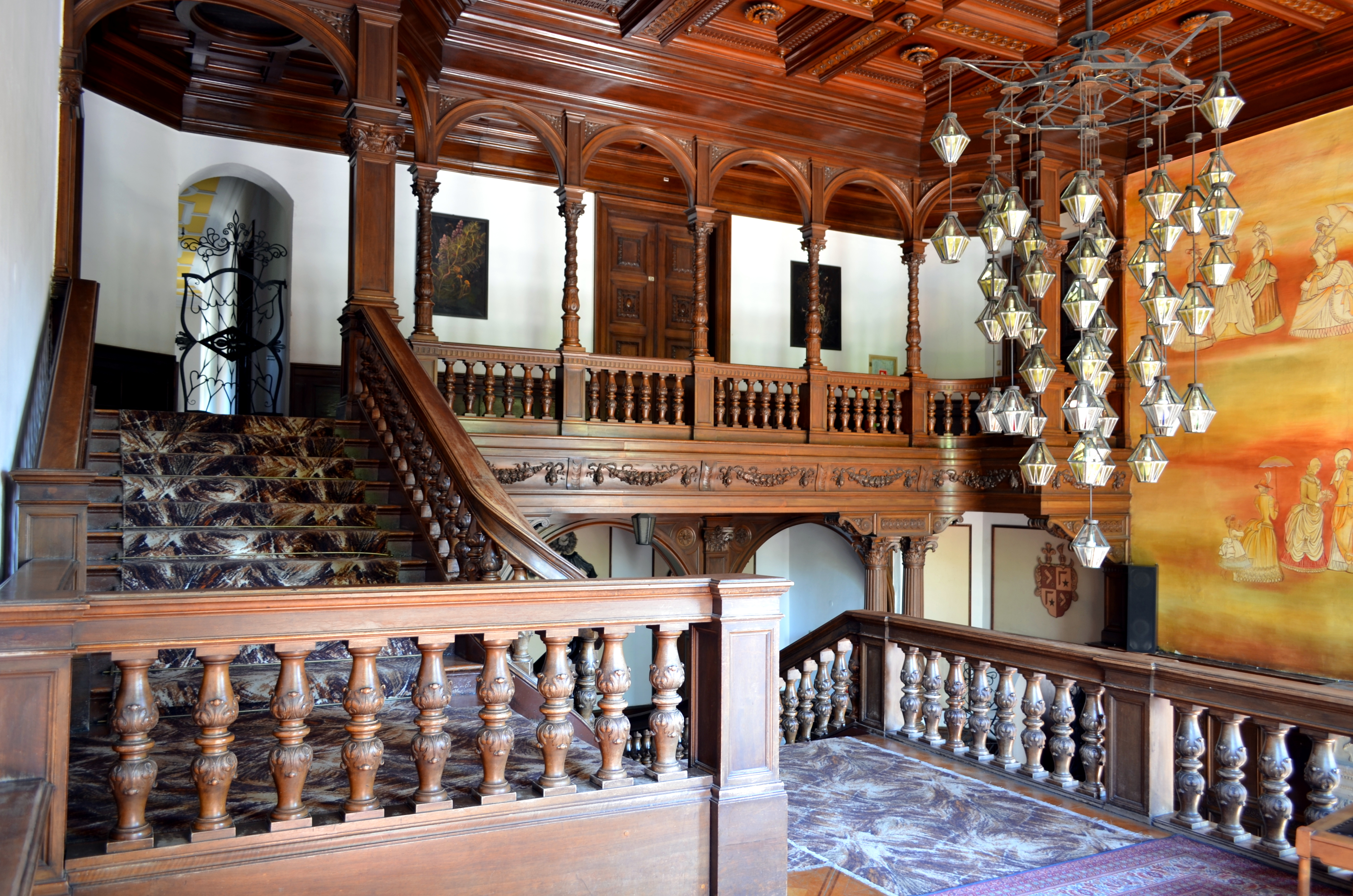
Interior of the castle

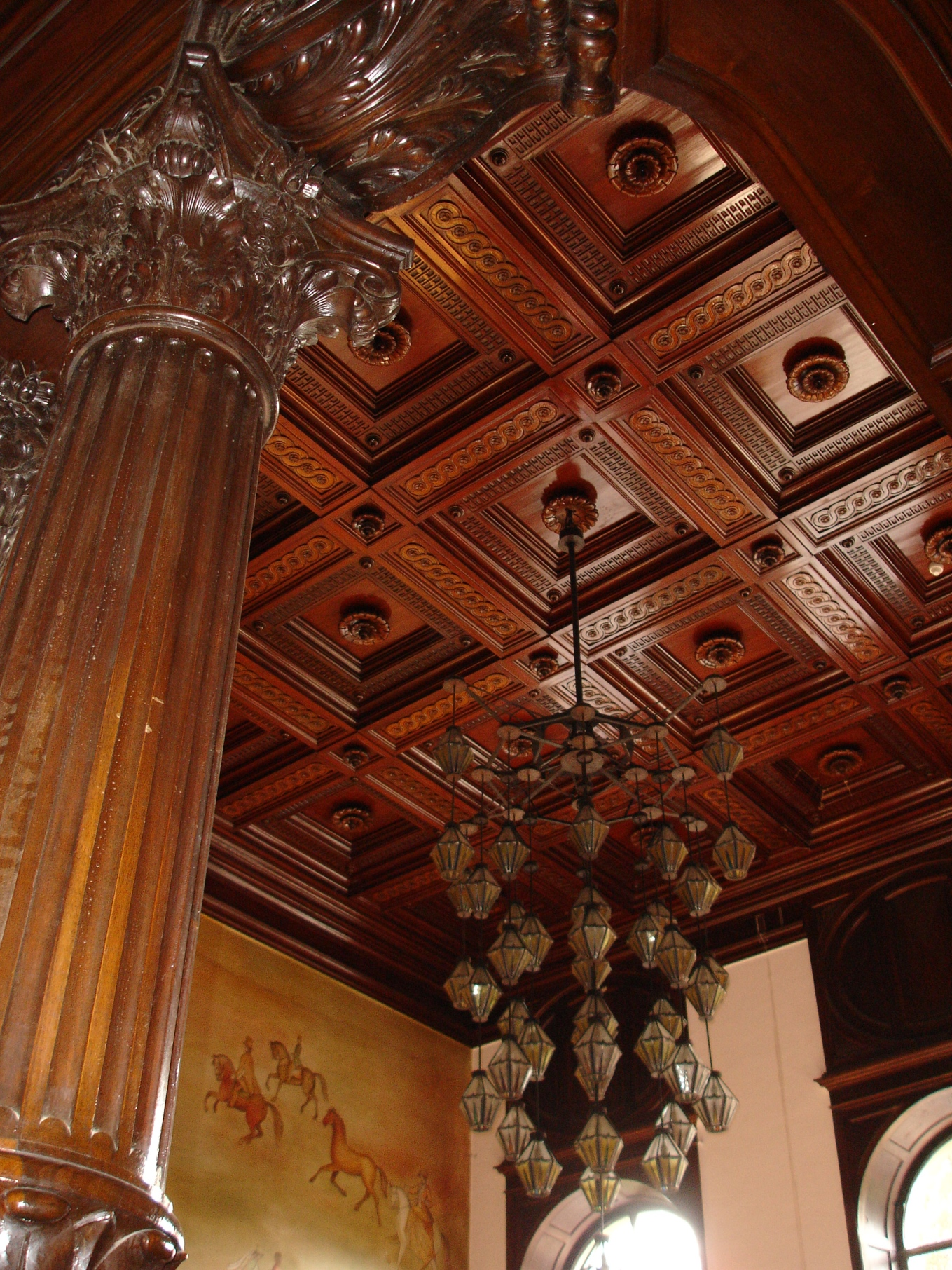
Details of the woodwork and coffered ceiling

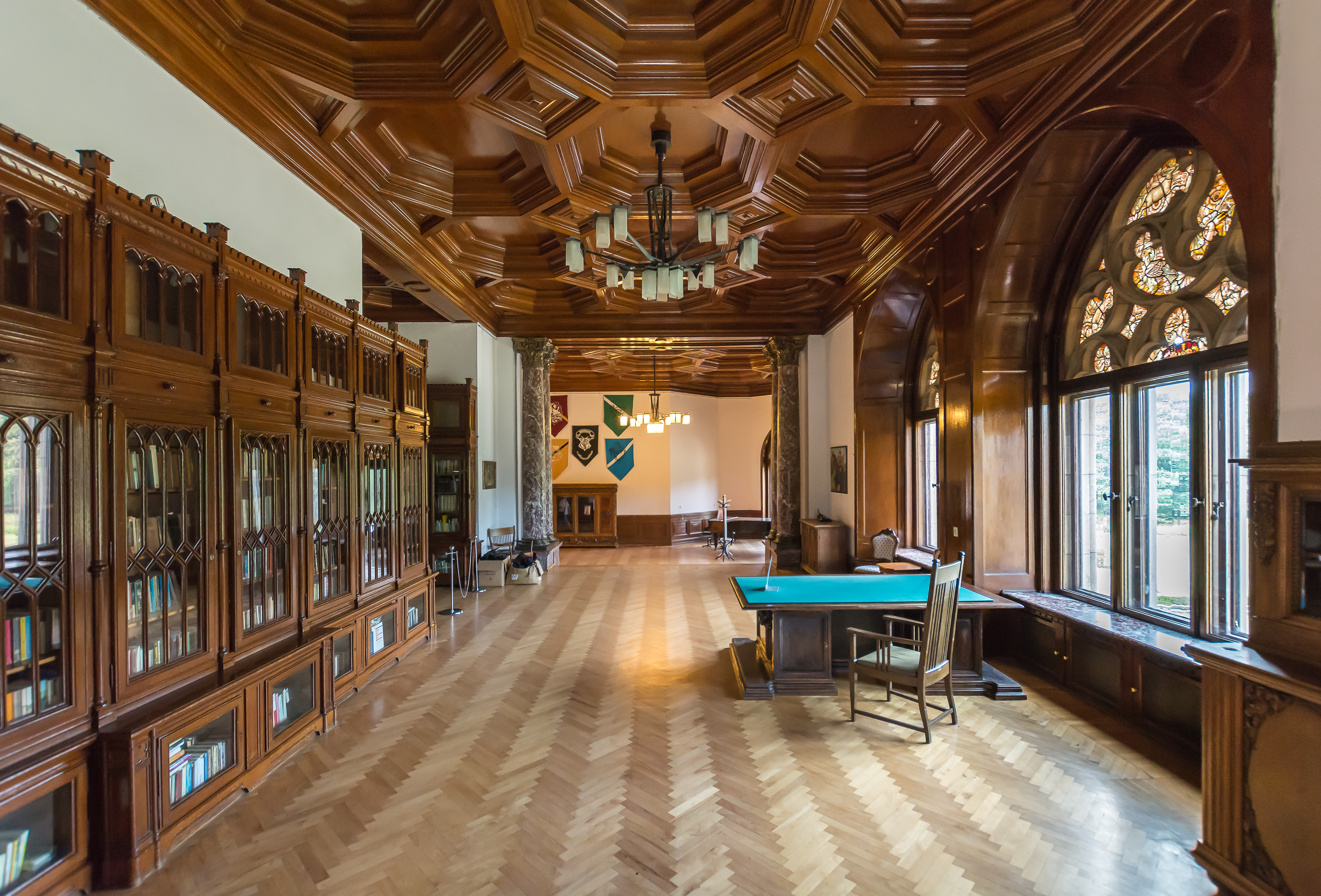
One of the chambers inside

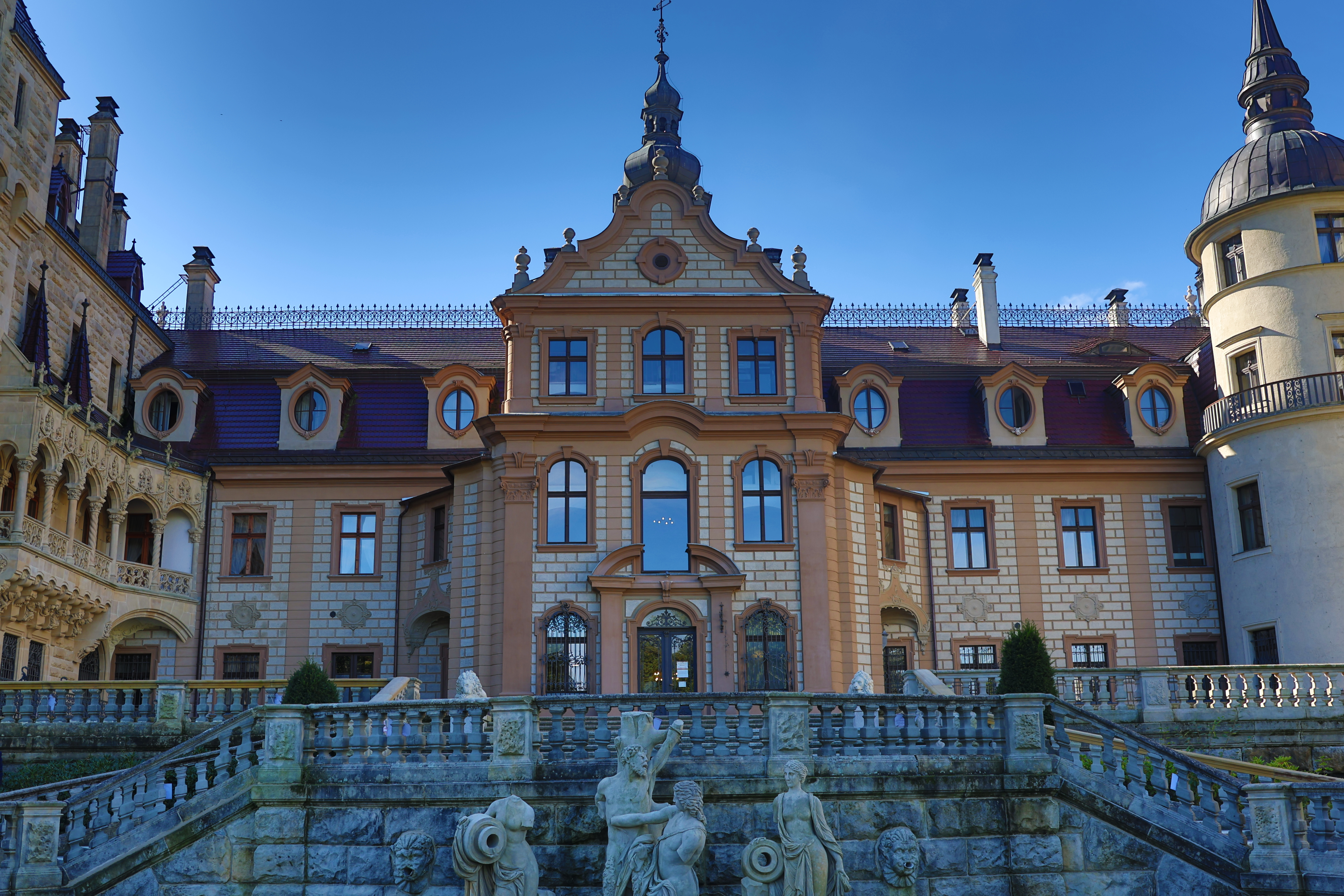
Garden façade

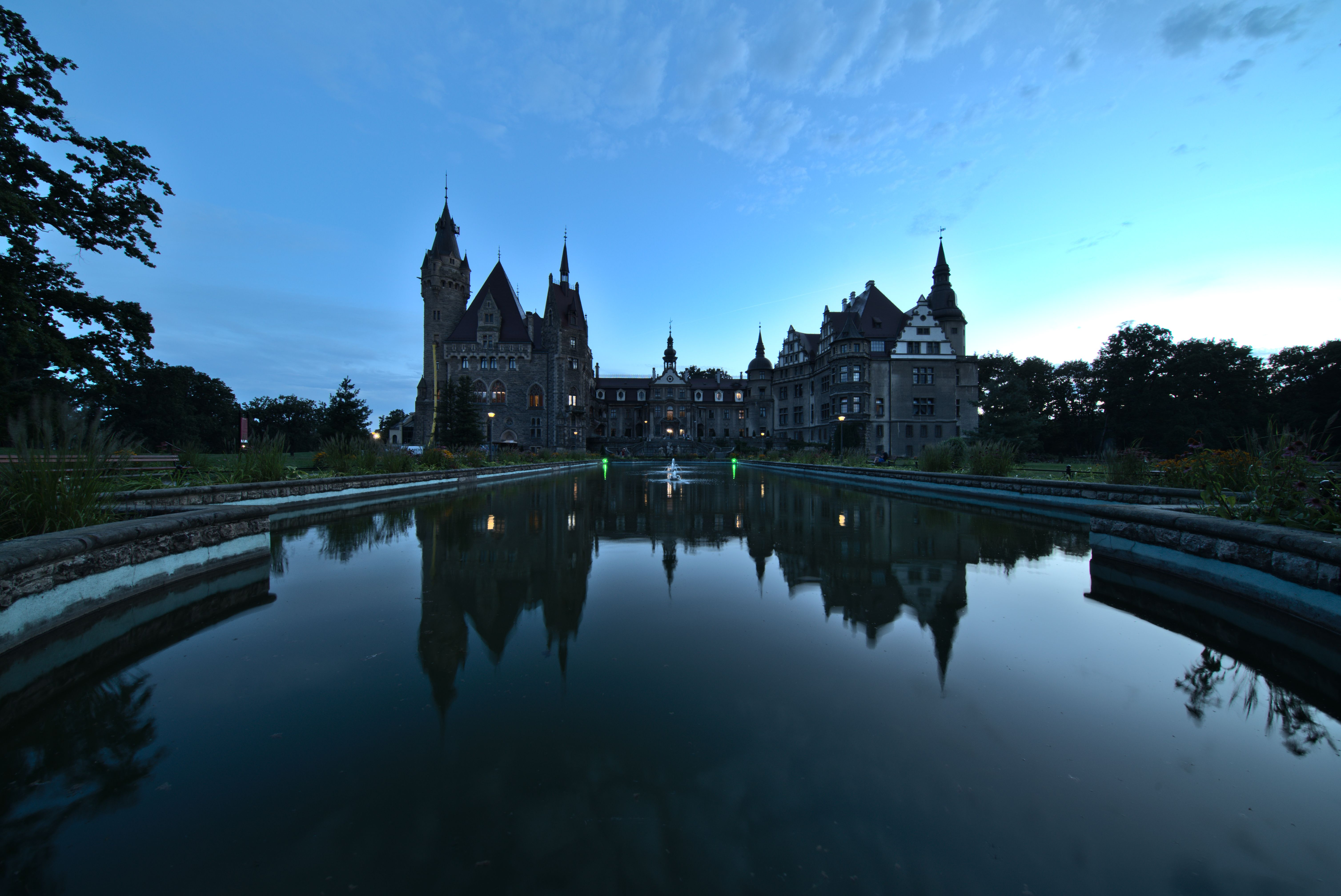
Moszna Castle at twilight

== See also ==
- Castles in Poland
