= Polska Zbrojna =

Polish military publication

- Language: Polish

Publication details
- History: October 1921 to present
- Publisher: Wojskowy Instytut Wydawniczy (Poland)
- Frequency: monthly

Standard abbreviations
- ISO 4: Polska Zbroj.

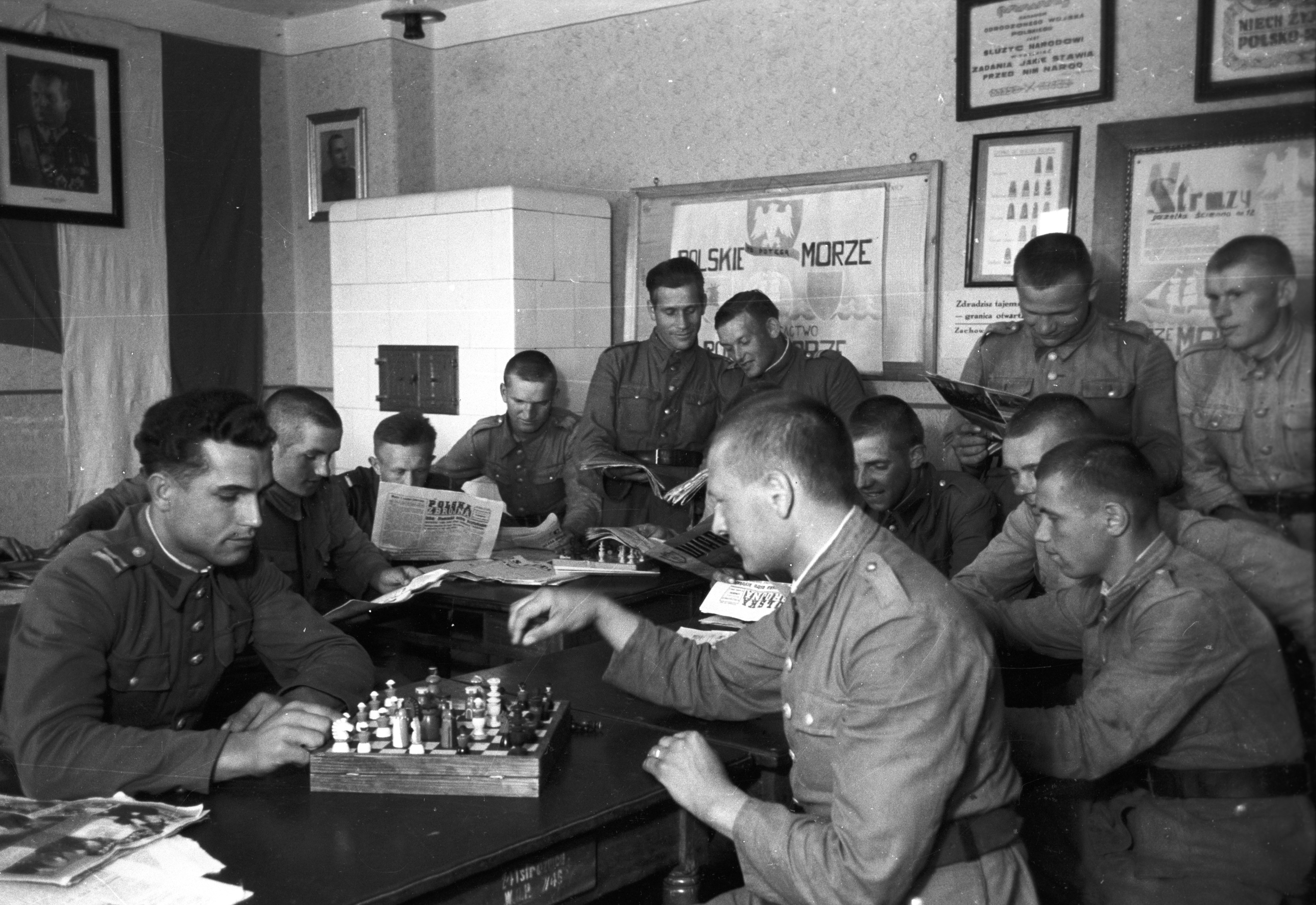
Border Protection Forces troops read Polska Zbrojna

Polska Zbrojna (Armed Poland) is a monthly magazine on military and military history, published in Poland. It is the largest regular publication in Poland focusing on that specific subject area, intended for soldiers of the regular army.

Polska Zbrojna is one of the oldest Polish magazines, first published in 1921 as a newspaper and semiofficial publication of the Polish Ministry of National Defense. Its publication was interrupted by World War II and resumed after the war ended. In 1950 the magazine was renamed as "Żołnierz Wolności" (Soldier of Freedom) and existed under that name until 1991.

Following the establishment the Third Polish Republic, in 1991 it returned to its original name, and soon afterwards turned into a weekly. It was published by Bellona Publishing House, and most recently by the Military Editorship, an agency of the Ministry of National Defense.
