= District of Opolian Silesia =

Former district of Second Polish Republic

District of Opolian Silesia Okręg Śląsk Opolski (Polish)
- District of the Republic of Poland
- 1945–1946
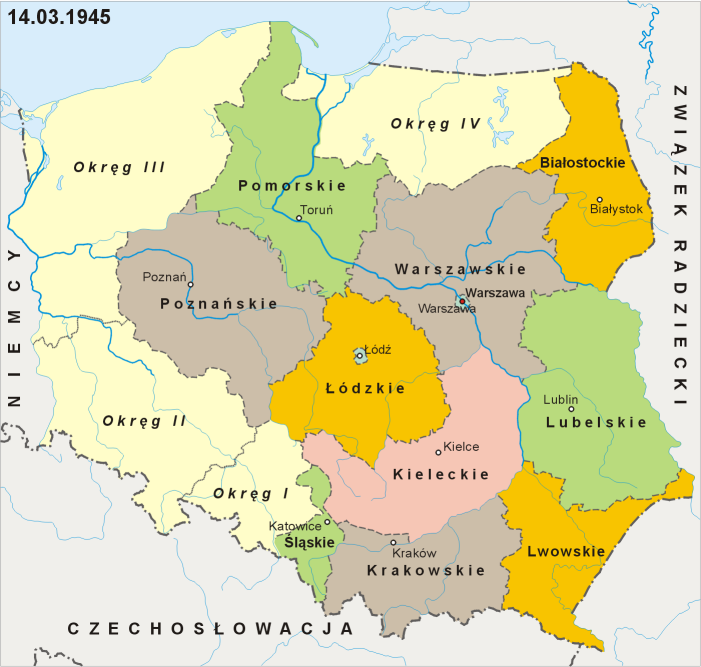
- The administrative subdivisions of Poland in 1945, including the District of Opolian Silesia
- Government
- Attorney-in-fact
  - 1945–1946: Aleksander Zawadzki
- History
  - Established: 14 March 1945
  - Disestablished: 24 June 1946
- Contained within
  - Country: Provisional Government of the Republic of Poland (1945); Provisional Government of National Unity (1945–1946)
Preceded by	Succeeded by
Province of Upper Silesia	Silesian Voivodeship

The District of Opolian Silesia, (Note: Polish: Okręg Śląsk Opolski) also designated as the 1st District, (Note: Polish: Okręg I) was a district that acted as a provisional administrative division of Poland, during the administration of the Provisional Government of the Republic of Poland in 1945, and the Provisional Government of National Unity from 1945 to 1946. It was centered around the area of the Upper Silesia. It was established as one of four provisional districts on 14 March 1945, and existed until 28 June 1946, when it was abolished and incorporated into the Silesian Voivodeship. The head of the district was the attorney-in-fact of the government, Aleksander Zawadzki.
