= Dziennik Ludowy =

Polish newspaper, 1918–1994

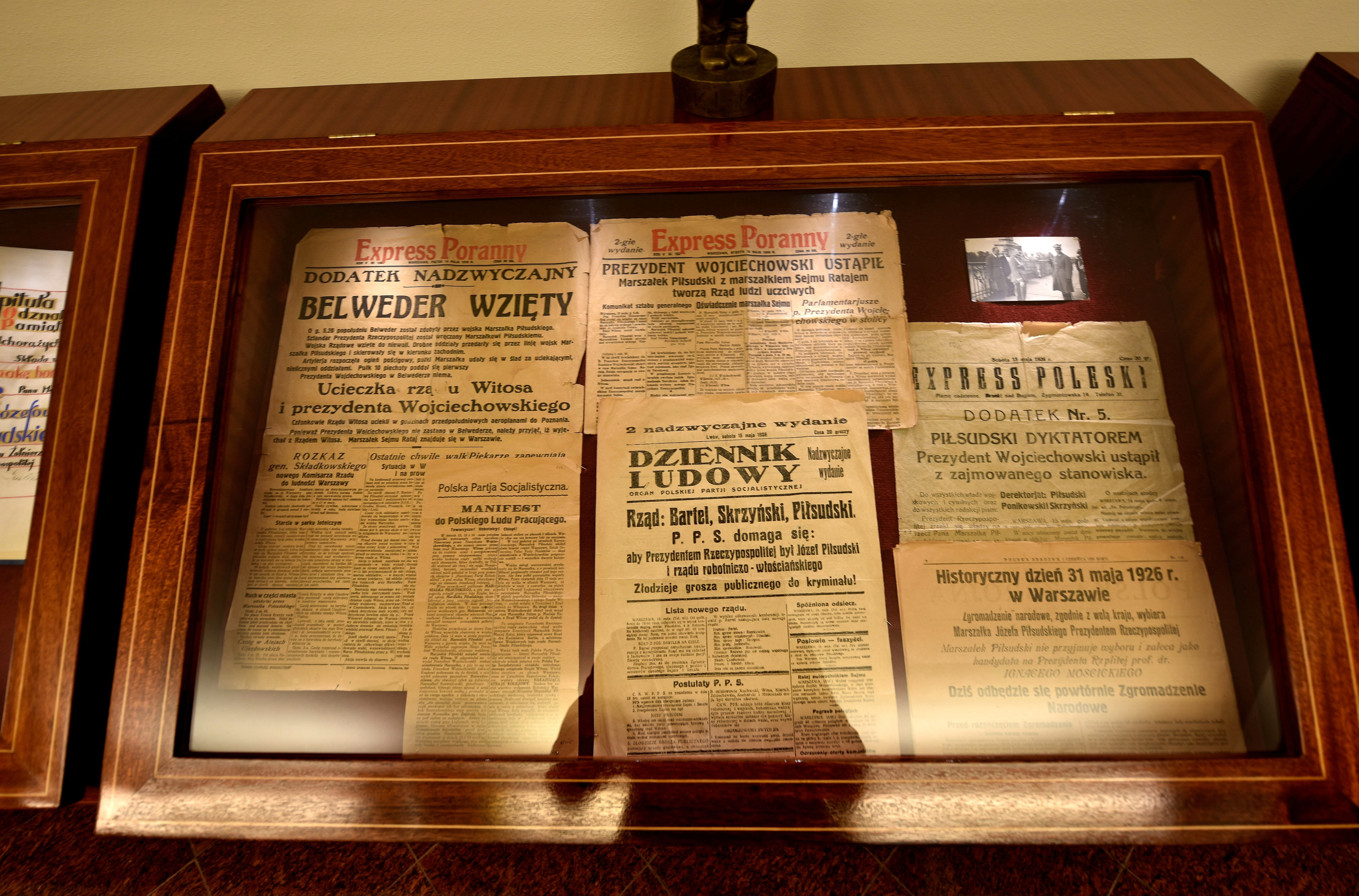
- Dziennik Ludowy on display at the Belweder
- Type: 6 days per week
- Format: 6–8 pages
- Editor: Jan Szczyrek
- Founded: 1918
- Ceased publication: 1994
- Headquarters: Lviv; Warsaw (1945–1949, 1957–1989)

Dziennik Ludowy (English: People's Daily) was a newspaper published in Lviv and Warsaw, Poland. The first issue was published in December 1918, and the final issue was published in 1994.

It was originally published in Lviv, but the paper was published in Warsaw from 1945 to 1949 and 1957 to 1989. It was associated with various Polish socialist political parties including the United People's Party and the Polish People's Party at different times.

Beginning in 1919, Polish socialist politician Jan Szczyrek was the editor of the paper.

The paper was discontinued in 1994.
