= Silesian Voivodeship (1945–1950) =

Former voivodeship of Poland

Silesian Voivodeship Województwo śląskie (Polish)
- Voivodeship of Poland
- 1945–1950
- Location of the Silesian Voivodeship within Poland, from 1946 to 1950.
- Capital: Katowice
- Area
  - 1947: 15,369 km^{2} (5,934 sq mi)
- Population
  - 1946: 2 800 000
  - 1949: 3 200 000
- Government
  - Type: Voivodeship
- Voivode
  - 1945 (first): Jerzy Ziętek
  - 1948–1950 (last): Bolesław Jaszczuk
- History
  - Established: 1945
  - Incorporation of the District of Opolian Silesia: 28 June 1946
  - Partition into the voivodeships of Katowice and Opole: 6 July 1950
- Contained within
  - Country: Provisional Government of the Republic of Poland (1945); Provisional Government of National Unity (1945–1947); Polish People's Republic (1947–1950)
Preceded by	Succeeded by
Province of Upper Silesia; District of Opolian Silesia	Katowice Voivodeship; Opole Voivodeship

The Silesian Voivodeship, (Note: Polish: Województwo śląskie) also known as the Basin–Silesian Voivodeship, (Note: Polish: Województwo zagłębiowsko-śląskie; also sometimes referred to as Silesian–Basin Voivodeship (Polish: Województwo śląsko-zagłębiowskie)) and the Silesian–Dąbrowa Voivodeship, (Note: Polish: Województwo śląsko-dąbrowskie) was a voivodeship (province) of Poland, with capital in Katowice, that existed from 1945 to 1950. It was located in the Upper Silesia. The voivodeship was established in 1945 and until 28 June 1945, remained under the administration of the Provisional Government of the Republic of Poland, which then was replaced by the Provisional Government of National Unity. On, 19 February 1947, the provisional government was replaced by the Polish People's Republic. On 28 June 1946, the District of Opolian Silesia had been incorporated into the voivodeship. It existed until 6 July 1950, when it was partitioned into the voivodeships of Katowice and Opole.

== History ==
On 22 August 1944, the Provisional Government of the Republic of Poland signed the resolution, that re-established the administrative subdivisions of the Second Republic of Poland, that existed until 1939, prior to the invasion of Poland by Nazi Germany. As such, the voivodeship had been established in early 1945, within the borders of the Silesian Voivodeship of the Second Polish Republic, that existed from 1920 to 1939. It was formed from the territory of the Province of Upper Silesia, occupied by the Red Army of the Soviet Union. Its capital was located in the city of Katowice. Until 28 June 1945, it remained under the administration of the Provisional Government of the Republic of Poland, which then was replaced by the Provisional Government of National Unity. On 19 February 1947, the provisional government was replaced by the Polish People's Republic.

It inherited the status of the autonomous administrative division from its predecessor, the pre-war Silesian Voivodeship, via the Organic Statute of the Silesian Voivodeship. Its autonomy had been revoked on 7 May 1945. On 18 August 1945, it incorporated the counties of Będzin and Zawiercie, from the Kielce Voivodeship. On 28 June 1946, the District of Opolian Silesia had been incorporated into the voivodeship. This included the land counties of Bytom, Dobrodzień, Gliwice, Głubczyce, Grodków, Kluczbork, Koźle, Niemodlin, Nysa, Olesno, Opole, Prudnik, Pszczyna, Racibórz, and Strzelce, and the city counties of Bytom, Gliwice, and Zabrze. The newly incorporated area had been administrated via a government office in Opole. In 1947, it had an area of 15 369 km^{2}.

The voivodeship existed until 6 July 1950, when it was partitioned into the voivodeships of Katowice and Opole.

== Subdivisions ==
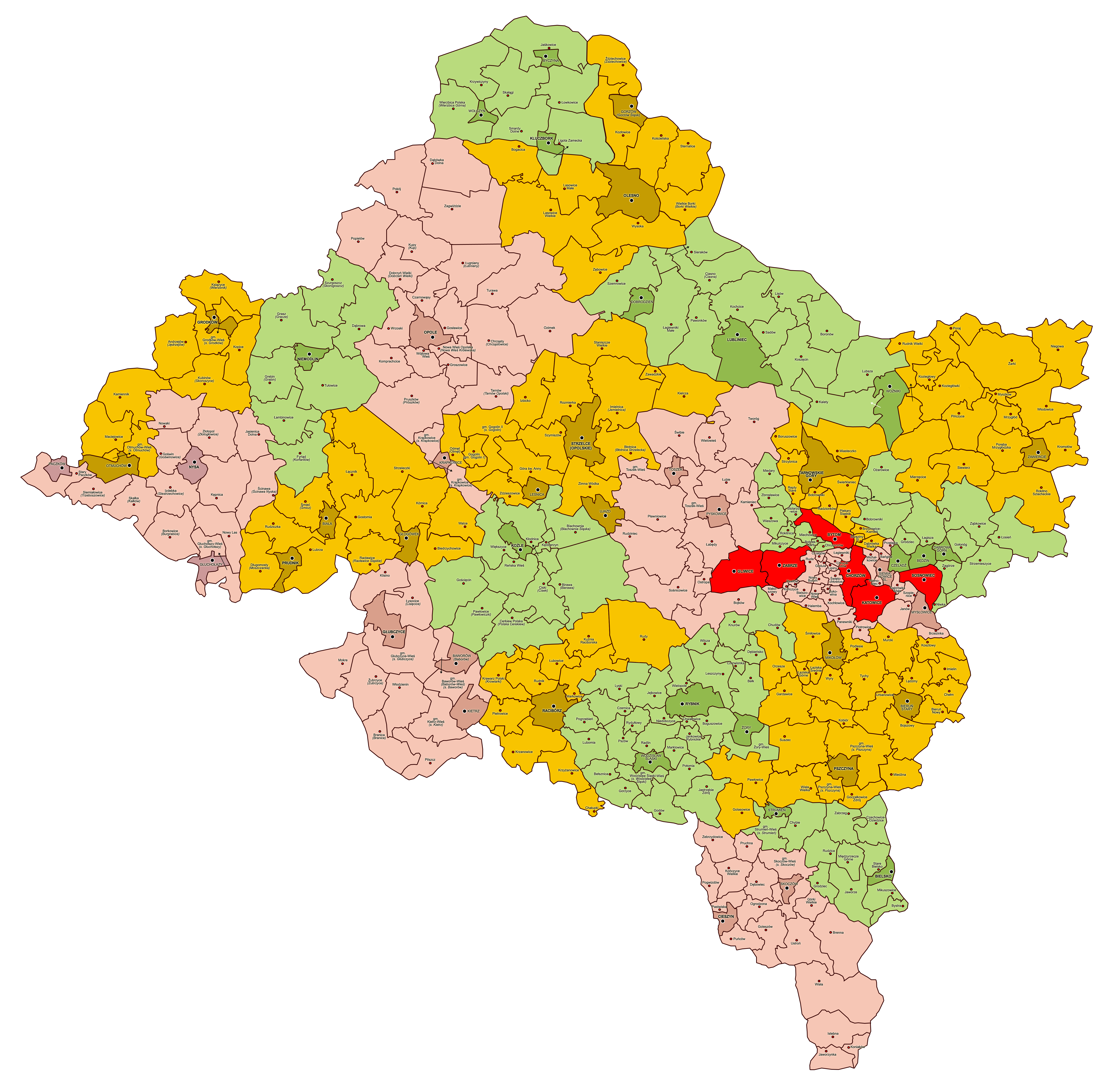
The map of the administrative subdivisions of the Silesian Voivodeship in 1946.

The voivodeship was divided into counties. Those were:

- Będzin County (seat: Będzin);
- Bielsko County (seat: Bielsko);
- Bytom (city county; 1946–1950);
- Bytom County (seat: Bytom; 1946–1950);
- Chorzów (city county);
- Cieszyn County (seat: Cieszyn);
- Dobrodzień County (seat: Dobrodzień; 1946–1950);
- Gliwice (city county; 1946–1950);
- Gliwice County (seat: Gliwice; 1946–1950);
- Głubczyce County (seat: Głubczyce; 1946–1950);
- Grodków County (seat: Grodków; 1946–1950);
- Katowice (city county);
- Katowice County (seat: Katowice);
- Kluczbork County (seat: Kluczbork; 1946–1950);
- Koźle County (seat: Koźle; 1946–1950);
- Lubliniec County (seat: Lubliniec);
- Niemodlin County (seat: Niemodlin; 1946–1950);
- Nysa County (seat: Nysa; 1946–1950);
- Olesno County (seat: Olesno; 1946–1950);
- Opole County (seat: Opole; 1946–1950);
- Prudnik County (seat: Prudnik; 1946–1950);
- Pszczyna County (seat: Pszczyna);
- Racibórz County (seat: Racibórz; 1946–1950);
- Rybnik County (seat: Rybnik);
- Sosnowiec (city county);
- Strzelce County (seat: Strzelce Opolskie; 1946–1950);
- Tarnowskie Góry County (seat: Tarnowskie Góry);
- Zabrze (city county; 1946–1950);
- Zawiercie County (seat: Zawiercie).

== Demography ==
Historical population
Year	1946	1949
Pop.	2,800,000	3,200,000
±%	—	+14.3%

== Leaders ==
The leader of the voivodeship was the voivode. The people in that office were:

- 1 February 1945 – 10 March 1945: Jerzy Ziętek;
- 14 March 1945 – 31 October 1948: Aleksander Zawadzki;
- 1 November 1948 – 13 June 1950: Bolesław Jaszczuk.

== Gallery ==
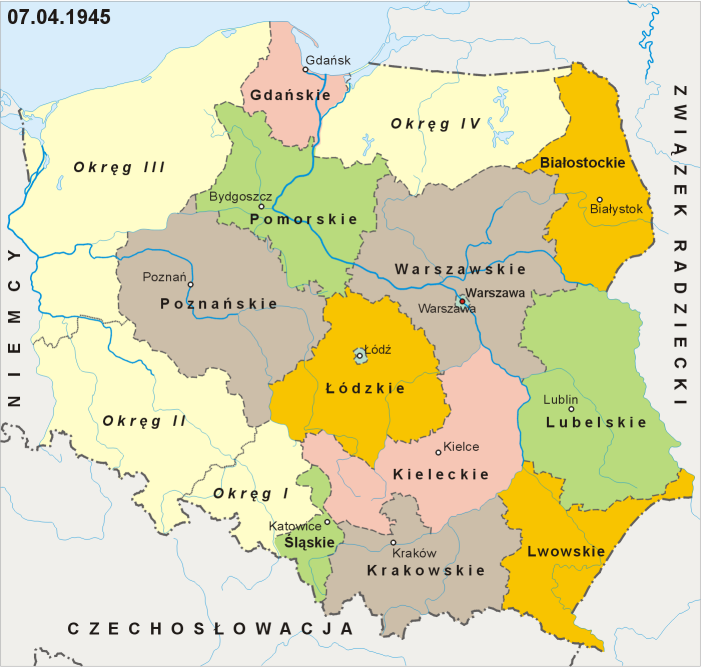
The administrative subdivisions of Poland in April 1945, including the Silesian Voivodeship.

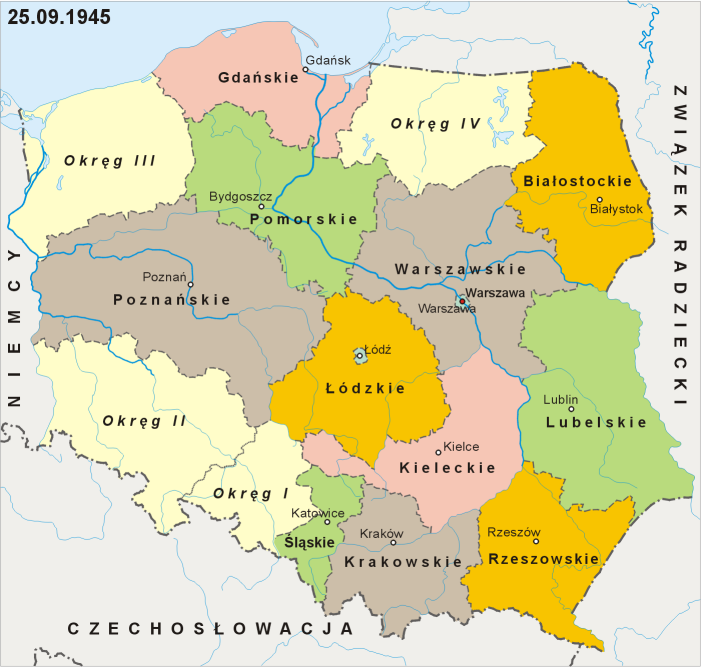
The administrative subdivisions of Poland in September 1945, including the Silesian Voivodeship.
