= Prudnik =

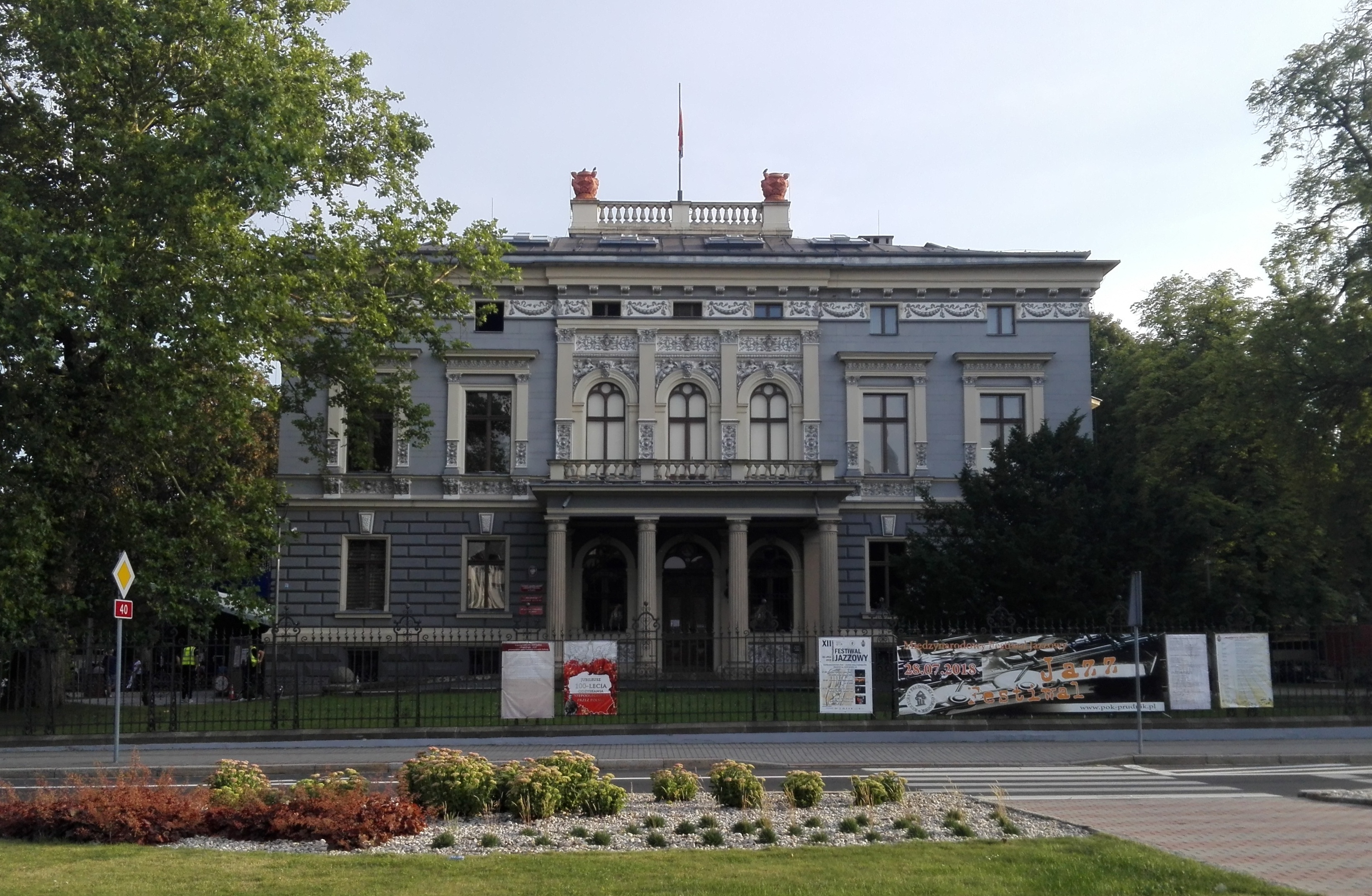
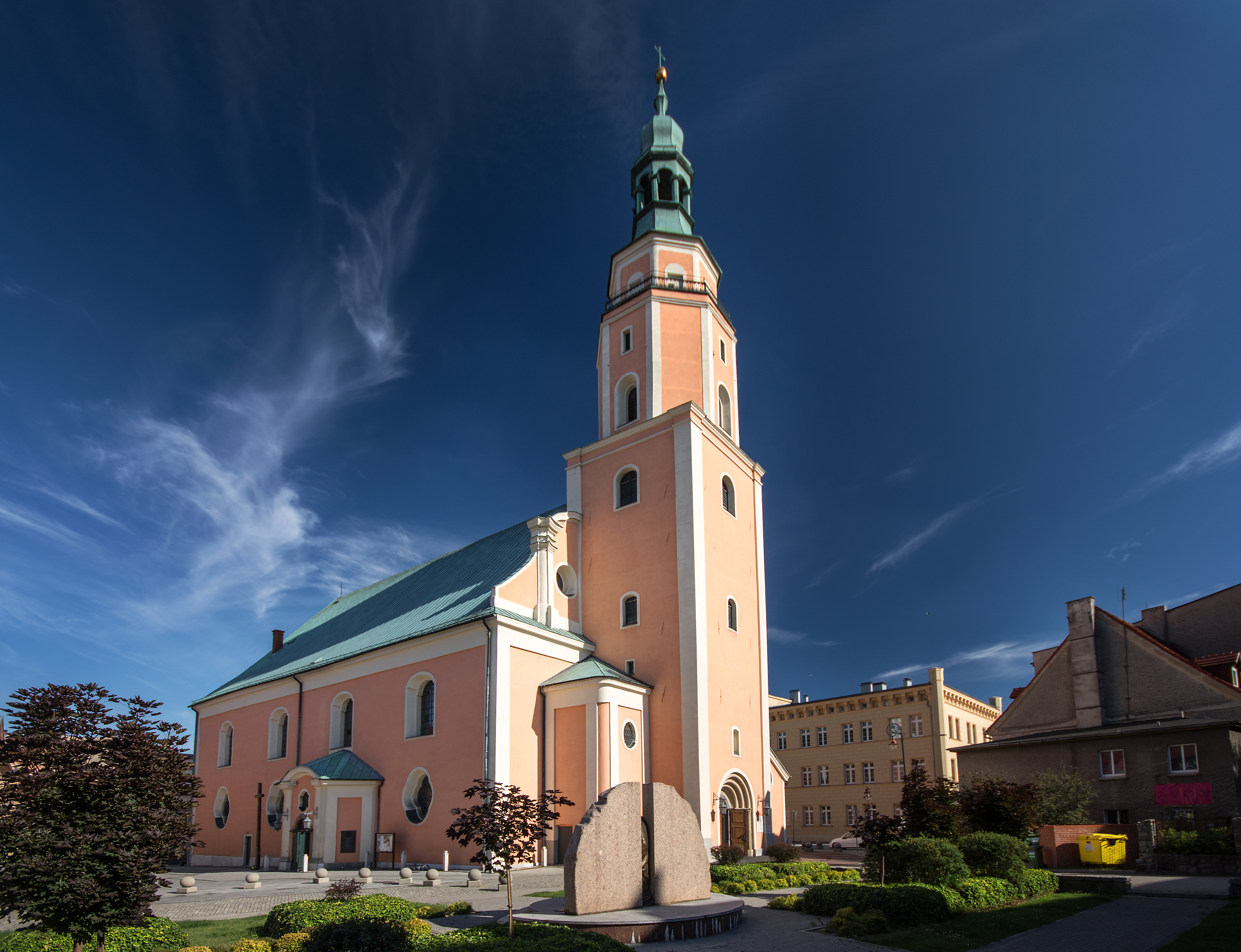
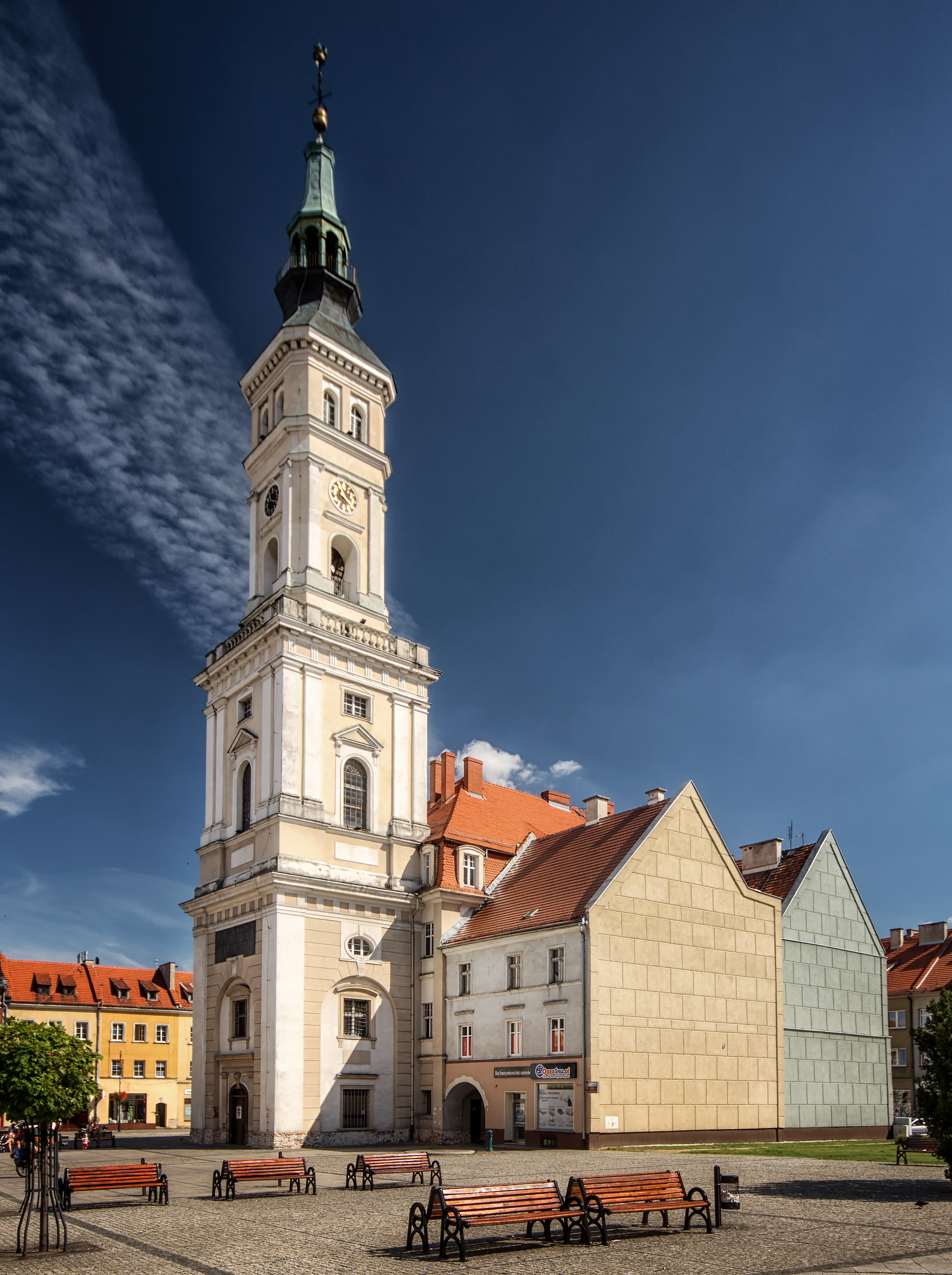
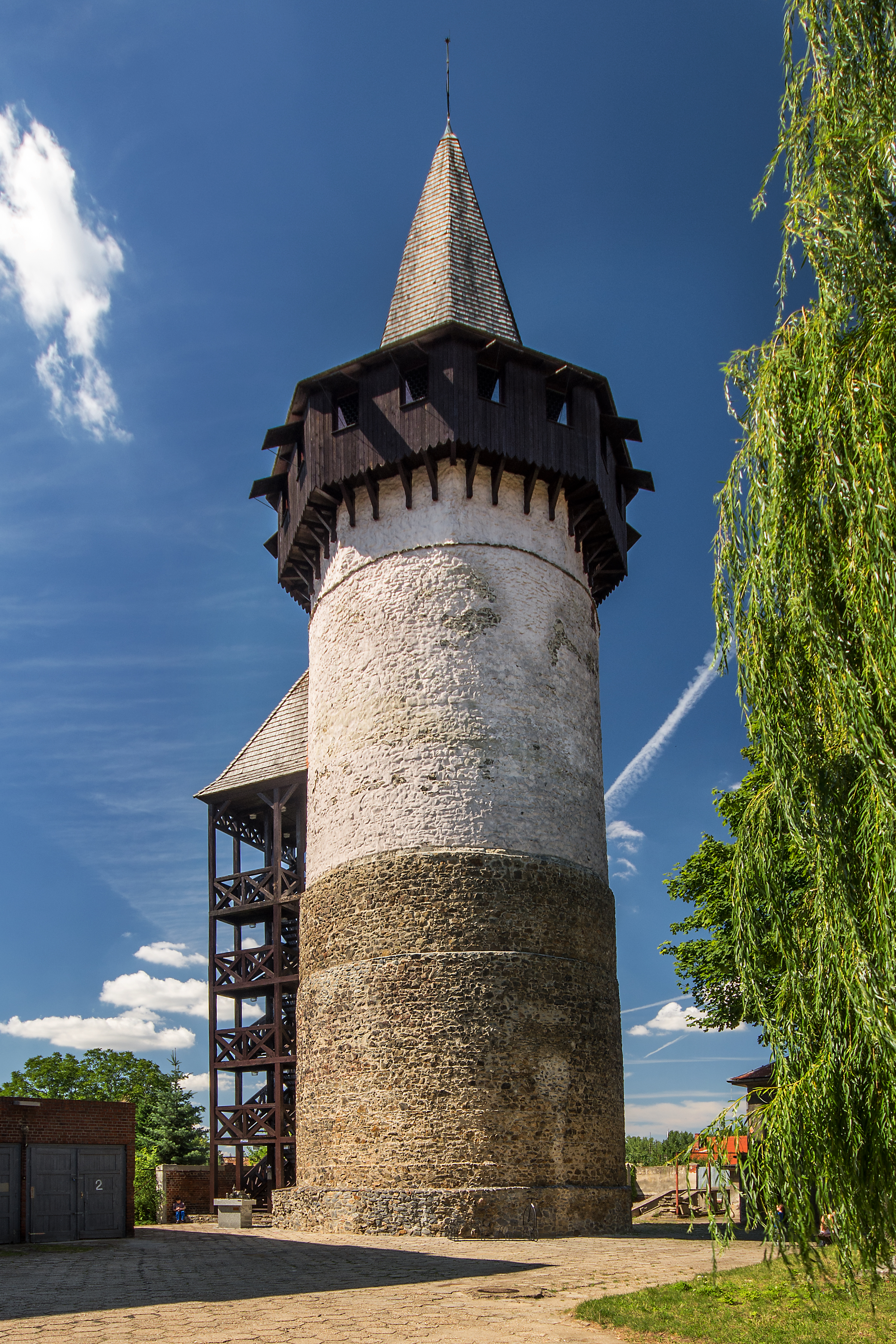
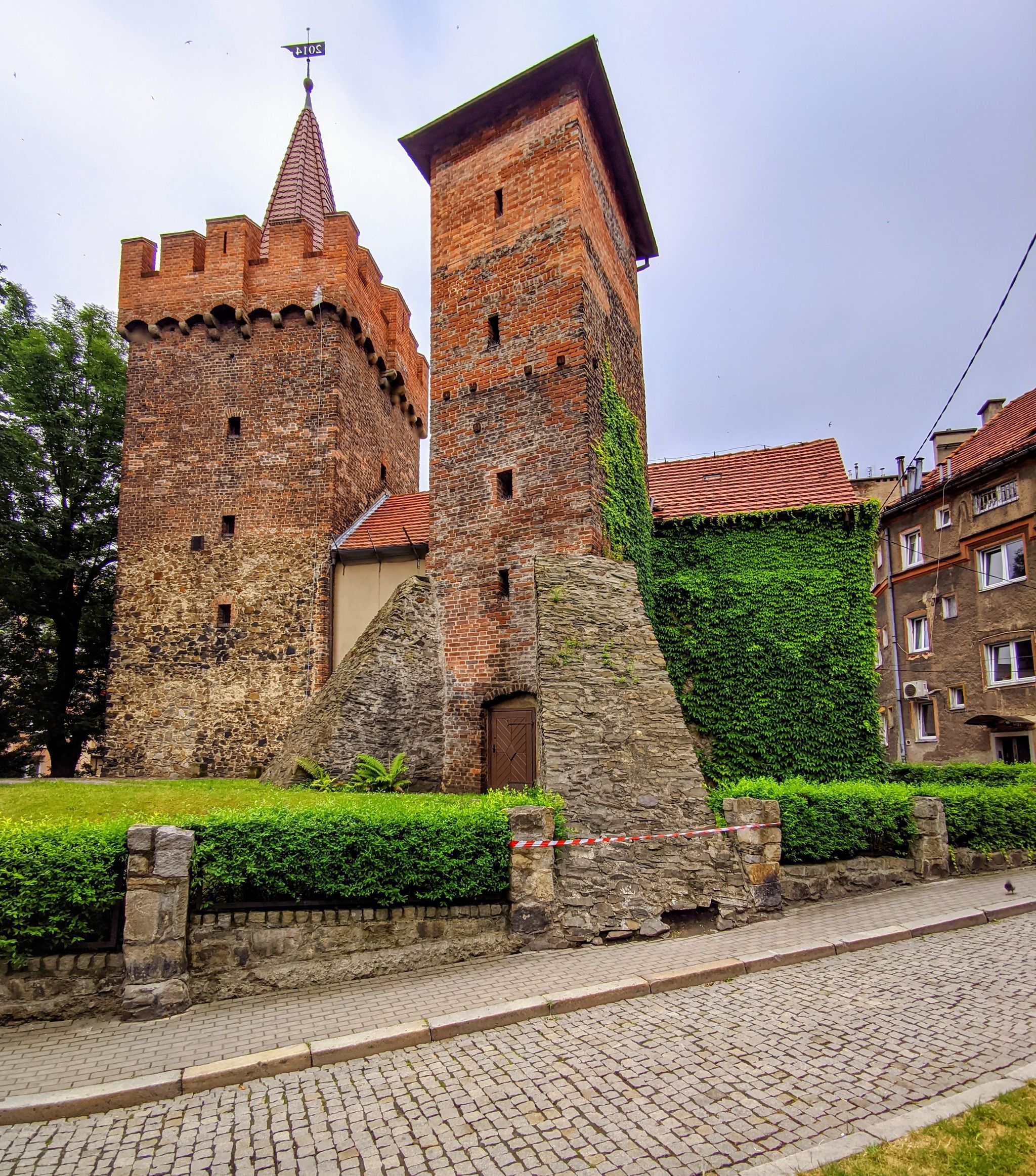
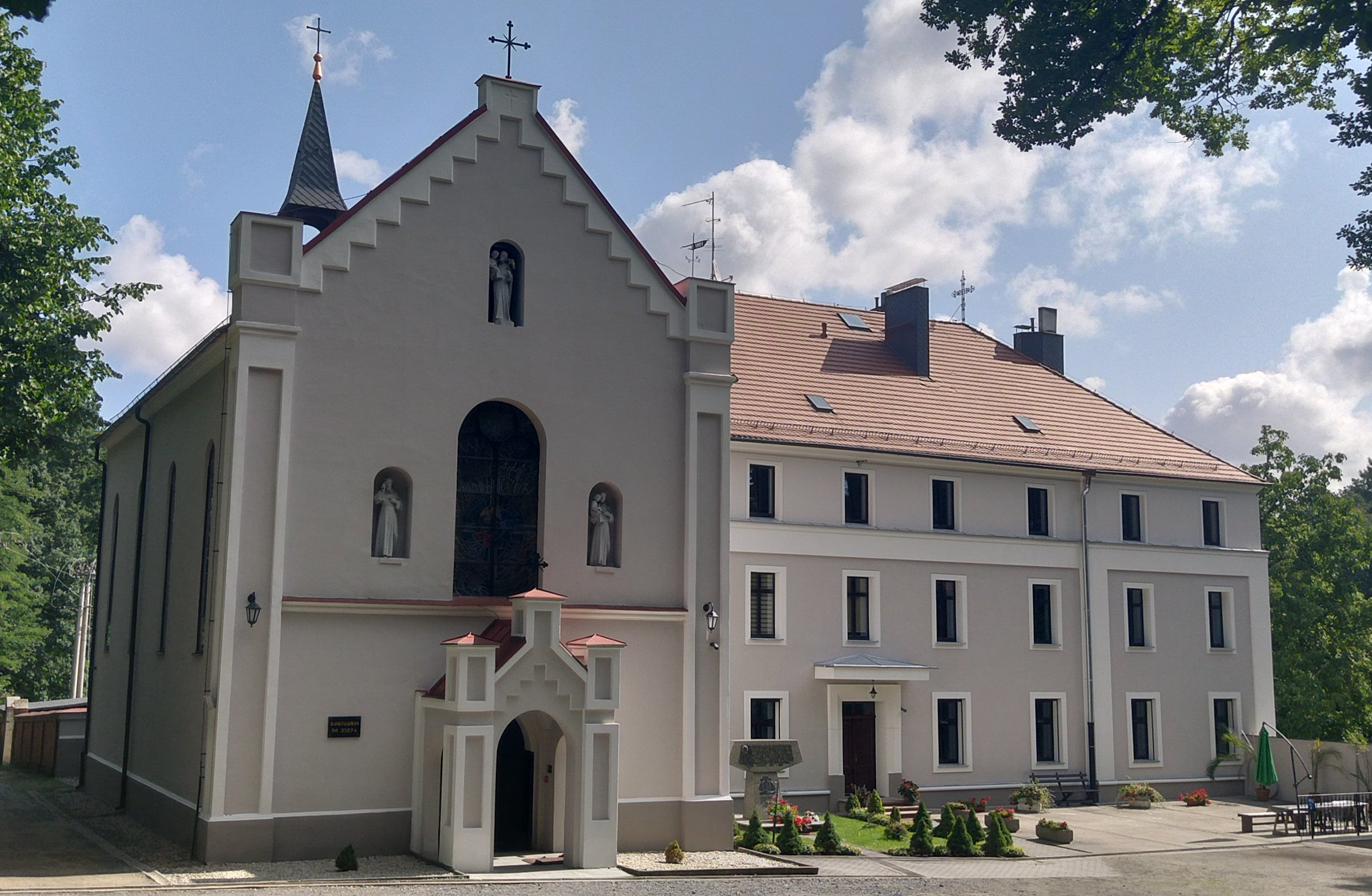
- Prudnik Culture Centre St. Michael's Church Town Hall Castle Tower Museum of Prudnik Region St. Joseph Church

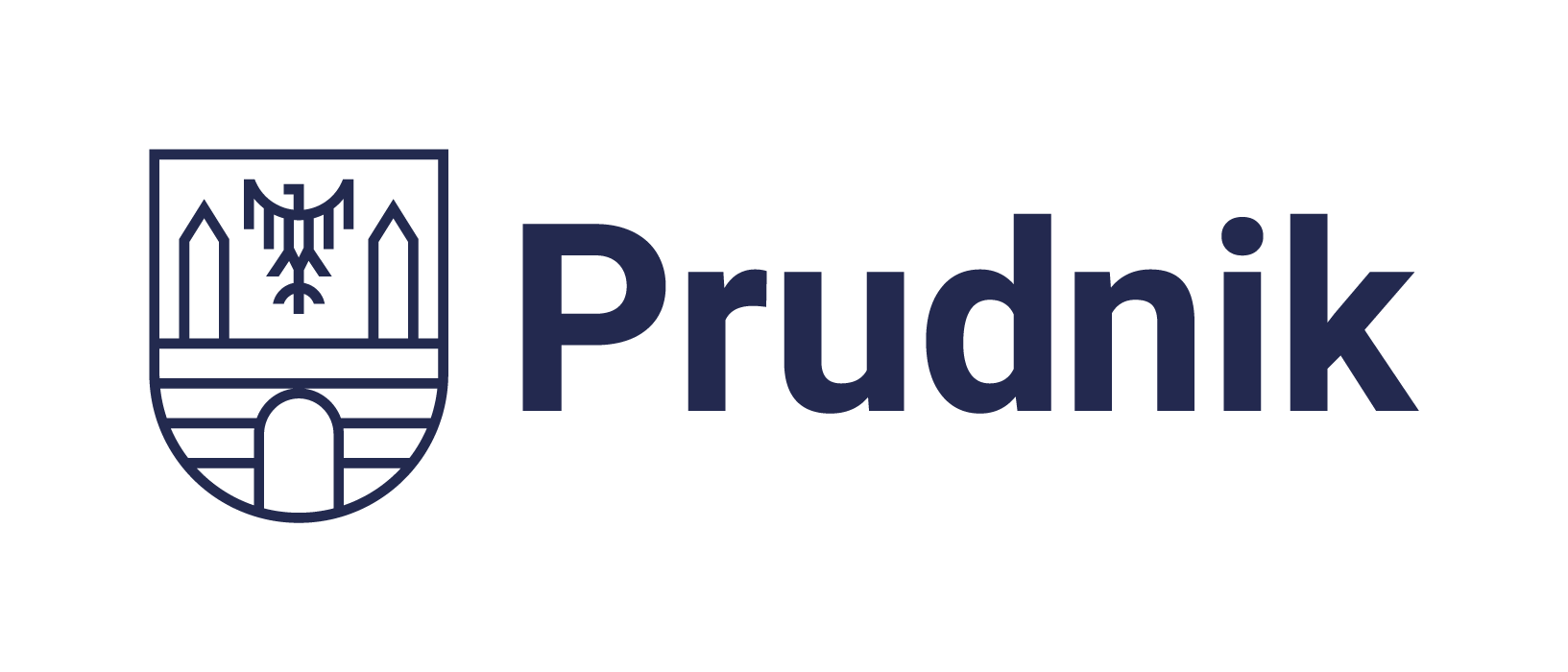
- Flag Coat of arms Brandmark
- Nicknames: Town of weavers and shoemakers
- Motto: Prudnik – spotkajmy się (Polish for "Prudnik – let's meet")
- Interactive map of Prudnik
- Location within Poland
- Coordinates: 50°19′17″N 17°34′49″E
- Country: Poland
- Voivodeship: Opole
- County: Prudnik
- Gmina: Prudnik
- Established: 1255
- Town rights: 1279

Government
  - Body: Prudnik Town Council
  - Mayor: Grzegorz Zawiślak (Ind.)

Area
  - Total: 20.50 km^{2} (7.92 sq mi)
- Highest elevation: 403 m (1,322 ft)
- Lowest elevation: 238 m (781 ft)

Population (30 June 2019)
  - Total: 21,041
  - Density: 1,000/km^{2} (2,600/sq mi)
- Demonym(s): prudniczanin (male) prudniczanka (female) (pl)
- Time zone: UTC+1 (CET)
  - Summer (DST): UTC+2 (CEST)
- Postal code: 48-200
- Area code: +48 77
- Car plates: OPR
- Website: www.prudnik.pl

Prudnik [ˈprudɲik] (Czech: Prudník, Silesian: Prōmnik, German: Neustadt) is a town in southern Poland, located in the southern part of Opole Voivodeship near the border with the Czech Republic. It is the administrative seat of Prudnik County and Gmina Prudnik. Its population numbers 21,368 inhabitants (2016). Since 2015, Prudnik is a member of the Cittaslow International.

The town was founded in the 1250s, and was historically part of the Piast-ruled Duchy of Opole, and afterwards was located within the Habsburg monarchy, the Polish–Lithuanian Commonwealth, the Habsburg monarchy again, Prussia, the German Reich, and eventually Poland again. It was once an important industrial hub known for its shoe-making traditions and more recently towel making by the ZPB "Frotex" Company, one of the largest towel manufacturers in Europe. The town also possesses numerous architectural monuments and historic buildings such as the Main Town Hall and "Wok's Tower" (Wieża Woka) from the 13th century.

== Etymology ==
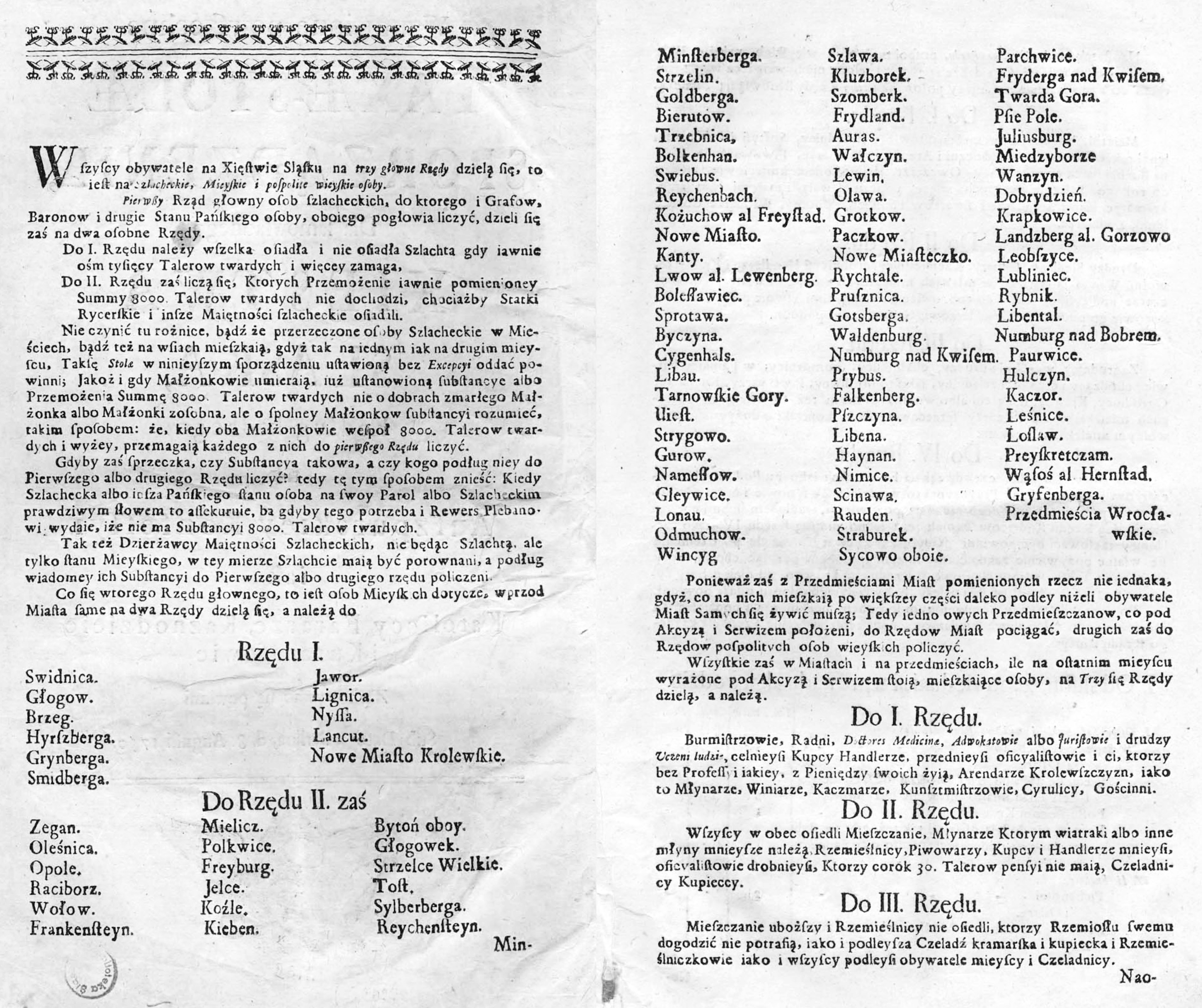
18th-century document mentioning the name Nowe Miasto Królewskie

The name "Prudnik" was created after the Polish word prąd (flow, stream, Czech: proud, Silesian: prōnd), similarly to the nearby villages of Prężyna and Prężynka, and means a river with a fast stream. In the Middle Ages, the town's name was written with a letter u, which was a Czech counterpart of ą (1262 Pruthenos, 1331 Prudnik). Since the 17th century, the name Prudnik was used alongside the German name Neustadt.

The town's German name was also written in its Latin form – Neostadium. Its occasionally used Polish and Czech translations were: Nowe Miasto and Nové Město. The town's older name also had its Latin form – Prudnicium. The town was also called Polnisch Neustadt ("Polish New Town"), but in 1708 it got replaced with Königliche Stadt Neustadt ("Royal Town New Town"). Its Polish counterpart, Nowe Miasto Królewskie, was used in a Polish document published in 1750 by Frederick the Great.

In the 19th century, the town's name was changed to Neustadt in Oberschlesien ("New Town in Upper Silesia"), while the Slavic name Prudnik was still used by its Polish inhabitants, which was mentioned in Upper Silesia's topographical description from 1865: "Der ursprünglische Stadtname "Prudnik" ist noch jetz bei den polnischen Landbewohnern üblich". In the alphabetic list of cities of Silesia published by Johann Knie in Wrocław in 1830, Polish name Prudnik was used along with German Neustadt ("Prudnik, polnische Benennung der Kreistadt Neustadt").

In Polish publications since the 20th century, the town's name was written as Prądnik. This name was also used formally in 1945. The town's name was changed to Prudnik on 7 May 1946.

In Polish, the town's name has masculine grammatical gender.

== History ==
=== Prehistory and the ancient times ===
Traces of human presence in the area of the present-day town of Prudnik, confirmed by archaeological research, date back to the Paleolithic era. The oldest settlements near Prudnik were formed by groups of hunters who exploited the surrounding flint deposits. Their products, found during excavations, are typical of the Acheulean culture, from the interglacial era. The local population of early Slavs held trade contacts with Rome, as documented by Roman coins found in Prudnik dating back to 700 BC–1250 AD. On a hill by the Złoty Potok river, in the western part of town, the remains of a warrior of the Germanic Vandals tribe, who died in the 4th century AD, were excavated.

=== Middle Ages ===
The area of present-day Prudnik was located at the borderlands between the local West Slavic tribes of Golensizi and Opolans. The earliest written information regarding settlements near Prudnik were included in the 1233 will of a Silesian nobleman Johannes Sibote, the owner of nearby villages of Jasiona, Skrzypiec, Krzyżkowice, Czyżowice and Lubrza. In 1253, the area was captured by the Czechs during a revenge campaign for the invasion of Opavian Silesia by Polish dukes Vladislaus I of Opole and Bolesław V the Chaste.

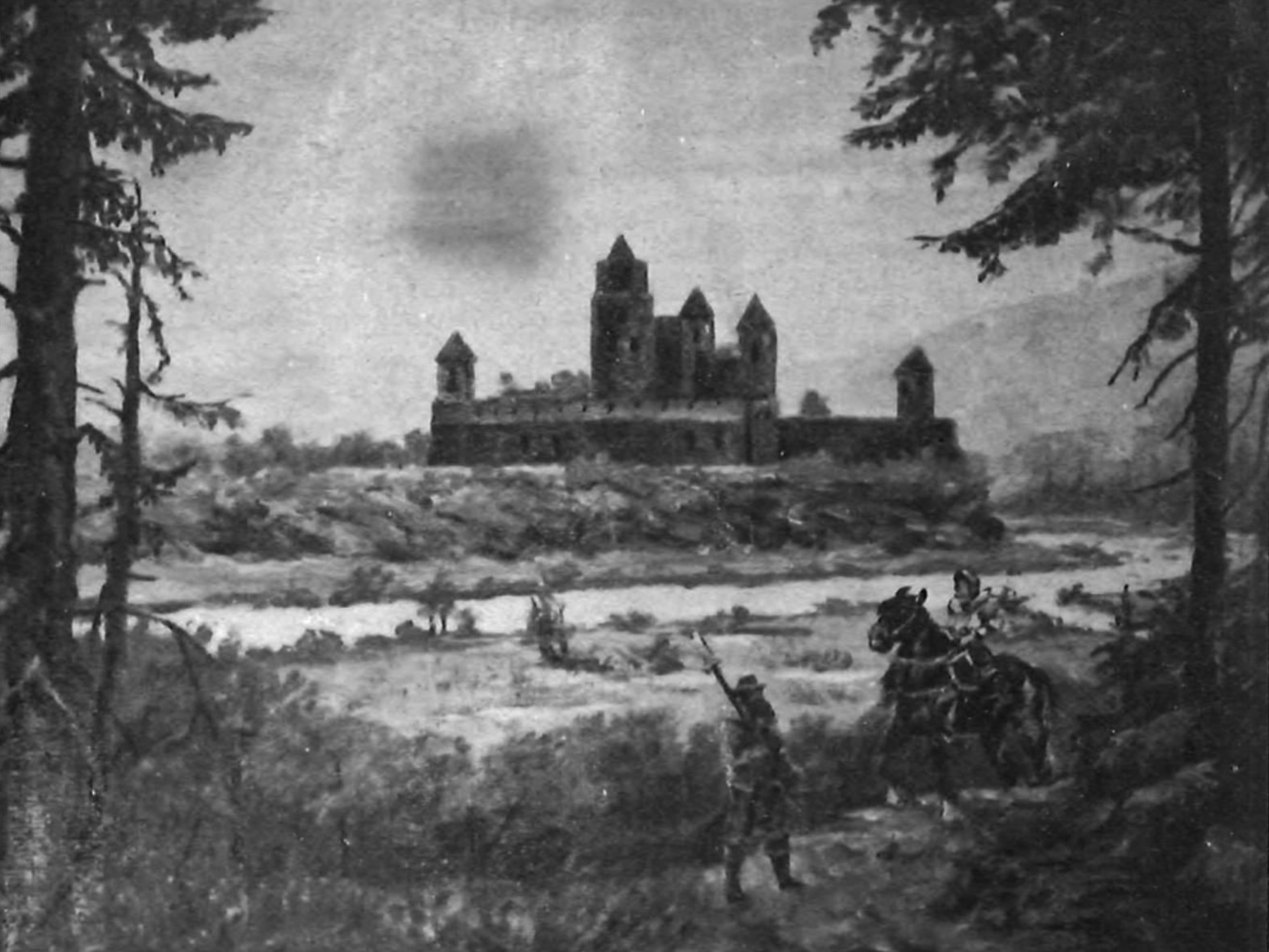
Prudnik Castle in 1260

In the Autumn of 1255, King Ottokar II of Bohemia instructed Vok of Rosenberg to help new settlers move into the borderland. Between 6 November and the middle of December of that year, Vok founded the Wogendrüssel castle in the defensive bend of the Prudnik river. The castle controlled the trade route between Nysa and Opava. The foundation of the castle in this place is equivalent to the foundation of Prudnik as a settlement. Prudnik was the northernmost stronghold of the Kingdom of Bohemia.

Vok's son, Henry I of Rosenberg, obtained Magdeburg rights for the town in 1279. After Henry's death, Prudnik was passed over to knight Jaxa de Snelwald. Prudnik belonged to the historical region of Moravia until 1337, when the town became a part of the Duchy of Opole in the Upper Silesia region, and remained under the rule of local Polish dukes of the Piast dynasty until the dissolution of the duchy in 1532, when it was incorporated into the Austrian-ruled Bohemian (Czech) Crown. It was located on a trade route between Wrocław and Vienna.

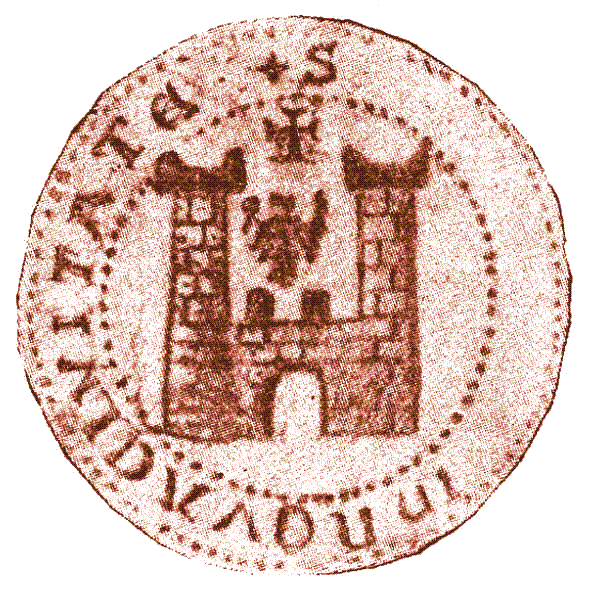
14th-century seal showing Prudnik's coat of arms

In 1373, the town suffered a plague epidemic. Several residents survived the epidemic by escaping into the nearby Opawskie Mountains. Having returned to Prudnik, they burned down most of the buildings and started the process of rebuilding the town. The oldest known form of Prudnik's coat of arms comes from a 1399 wax seal.

During the Polish–Lithuanian–Teutonic War, a knight known as Maćko of Prudnik (Maczke von der Neuwidnstadt) fought in the Battle of Grunwald on 15 July 1410 alongside Polish troops. After the death of late Duke Vladislaus II's wife, brothers Bernard of Niemodlin and Bolko IV of Opole took over the area of Prudnik and Głogówek. The rule of the area was later passed over to Bolko IV's son, Bolko V the Hussite. The first written mention of Bolko V as the ruler of Prudnik is dated 6 May 1425. Bolko V titled himself as the Duke of Głogówek and Prudnik. During the Hussite Wars, the town of Prudnik and nearby villages were plundered and burned down by the Hussites. On 23 March 1464, Prudnik and villages around it were excommunicated by Pope Pius II for refusing to pay the debt of Duke Konrad IV the Elder. Although local historian Antoni Dudek has claimed that the excommunication was revoked in 16th century, the Holy See never revealed a document that lifted the curse.

=== Early modern era ===
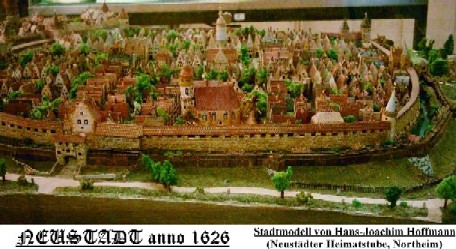
Contemporary model of Prudnik in 1626

In 1506, a Silesian Sejm took place in Prudnik, in the presence of King Sigismund I the Old of Poland. While in Prudnik, the King recruited 200 troops into the light cavalry to maintain public order in Silesia. After the death of Duke Jan II the Good in 1532, Prudnik, along with the entire Duchy of Opole and Racibórz, was incorporated into the Habsburg monarchy. In 1562, the Austrian-ruled Duchy of Opole and Racibórz passed a resolution that obligated Jews to sell their houses, pay their debts, and leave the duchy in a year. On the basis of this resolution, in 1564, Jews were ordered to leave Prudnik, but Krzysztof Prószkowski, who leased the land there, let them stay until 1570.

In the years 1645–1666, Prudnik belonged to the Polish–Lithuanian House of Vasa as a fief. As a royal city, Prudnik became a hub of trade and industry. Linen makers of Prudnik were exporting their products to the Netherlands. Tanning businesses were also started in the town. Since the 16th century, the richest noblemen of the Duchy of Opole and Racibórz were settling in the town, and Prudnik became the most important industrial and political hub of Upper Silesia. It was also the place in which the Silesian Sejms took place. The noble family of Bilitzer originated from Prudnik.

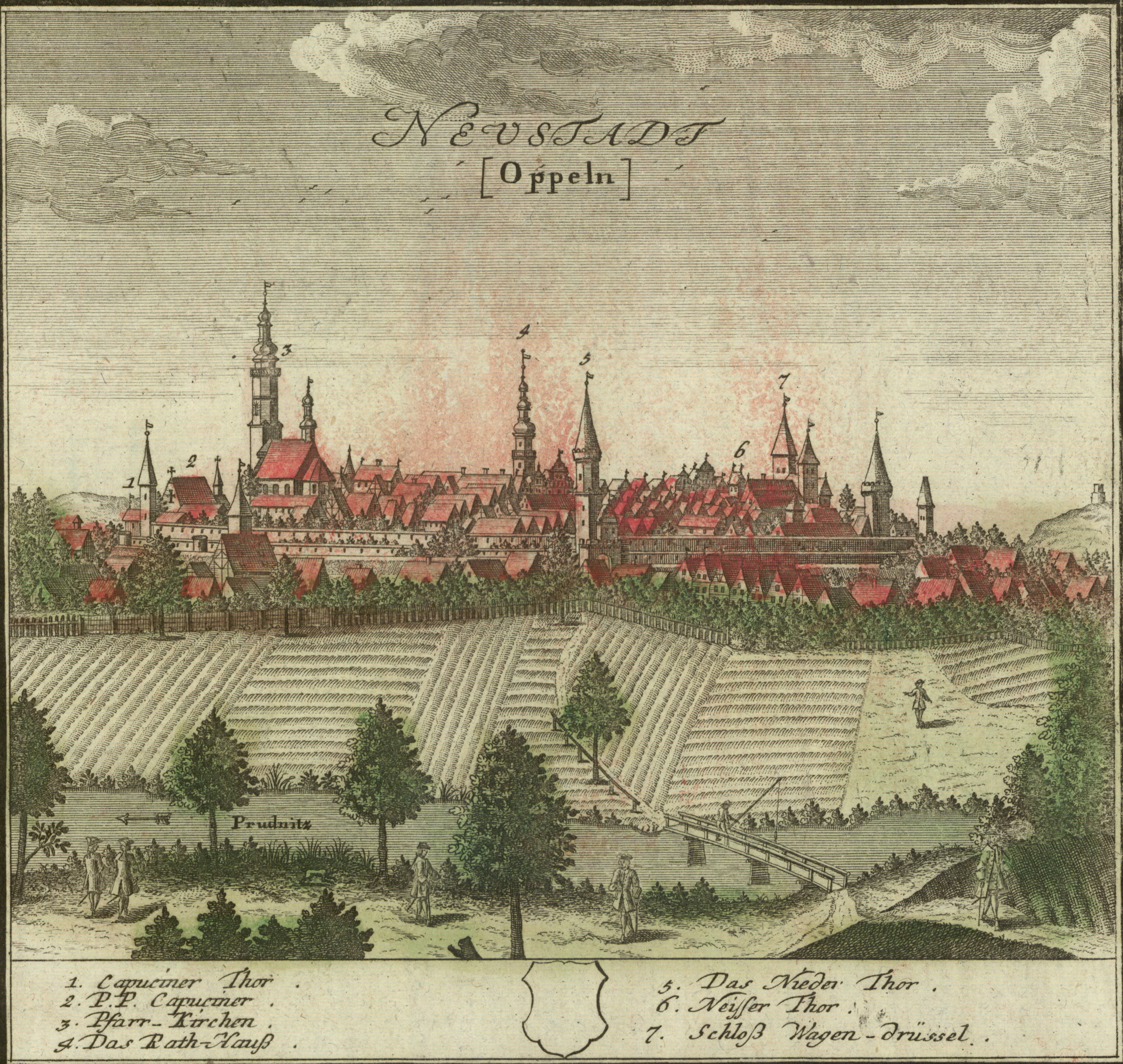
Panoramic view of Neustadt (Prudnik), drawn by Friedrich Bernhard Werner, 1739

The population of Prudnik was decimated during the Thirty Years' War. In 1625, the town suffered a plague epidemic. On 12 February 1629, Emperor Ferdinand II exiled the Protestant clergy of Prudnik, while people of the town were forced to convert to Catholicism. In 1642, the Swedish army captured Prudnik, then they plundered it and burned it down. After the end of the war, the town was rebuilt thanks to Emperor Ferdinand III's financial help. Soon, Prudnik would become the biggest city of Upper Silesia. Prudnik was a place of witch trials.

Because of Prudnik being located at the borderlands, the town was a sight of multiple battles during the Silesian Wars. On 30 June 1761, King Frederick the Great of Prussia visited the town. In February 1779, during the War of the Bavarian Succession, Austrians led an artillery attack on Prudnik, burning down most of the town's buildings. In an act of revenge, Prussians destroyed Krnov. Prudnik was visited by Emperor Joseph II in August 1779. On 20 August 1788, King Frederick William II of Prussia was passing through the town. He spent the night in the local Town House, while his son Frederick William III accommodated in a house by the Market Square.

In the middle of the 18th century, Prudnik was considered to be the richest town of Upper Silesia. Its incomes were ten times higher than that of Opole, the capital of the region. This was caused by the fact that the town was an owner of eleven nearby villages: Czyżowice, Dębowiec, Dytmarów, Jasiona, Krzyżkowice, Lubrza, Piorunkowice, Pokrzywna, Skrzypiec, Szybowice, Wieszczyna and a part of Rudziczka. After the feudal service was abolished in the 19th century and the villages became independent, Prudnik's Town Council began to look for a source of income in forestry. Prudnik owned one of the biggest communal forest complexes in Upper Silesia (the Prudnik Forest), with an area of more than 1,000 hectares (2,500 acres).

=== 19th century ===
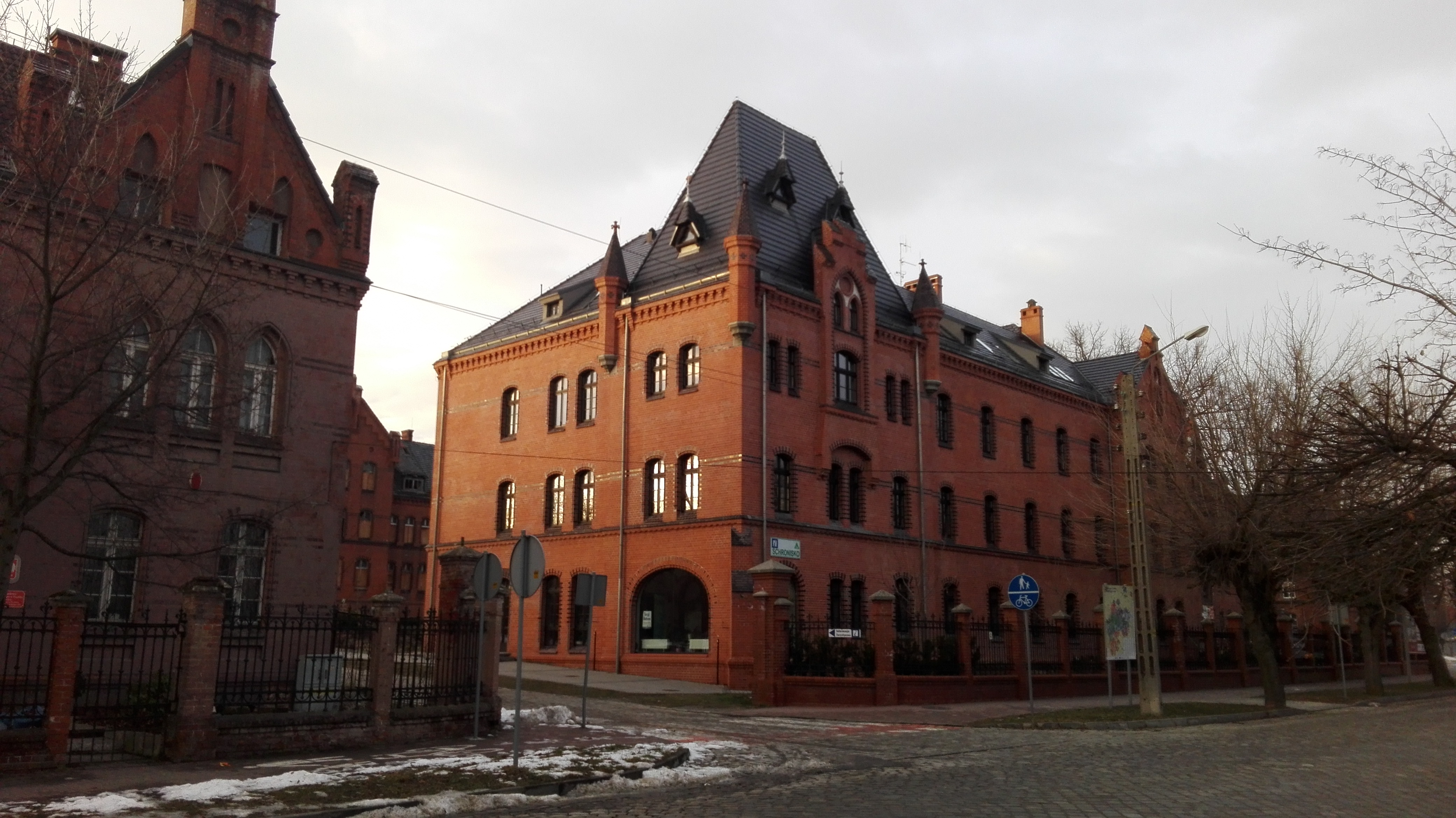
Former military barracks in Prudnik

The start of the 19th century saw further development of the town, mainly through the accommodation of Prussian soldiers. During the Napoleonic Wars, Prudnik was captured by the French army at the start of 1807. In accordance to Emperor Napoleon Bonaparte's decree from 6 April 1807, an uhlan regiment of the Legion of the Vistula was formed in Prudnik. The regiment was made up of Polish troops returning from Italy, reinforced with recruits from Greater Poland. Prudnik remained under French occupation until 1812, when it was captured by Russians. After the wars, in 1816 the town had a debt of 82,330 thalers, with revenues of 14,687 thalers and expenses of 14,238 thalers. The debt lasted until the Franco-Prussian War of 1870. In 1828, the town had about 4,000 inhabitants. The first spinning and weaving mills for wool, linen and silk were built in the town, as well as a textile factory (known as ZPB "Frotex" since 1945) founded by the Jewish industrialist Samuel Fränkel. A brickyard, a brewery, mills and a vinegar factory were also built. In reference to the main professions of its inhabitants, Prudnik was nicknamed the "town of weavers and shoemakers".

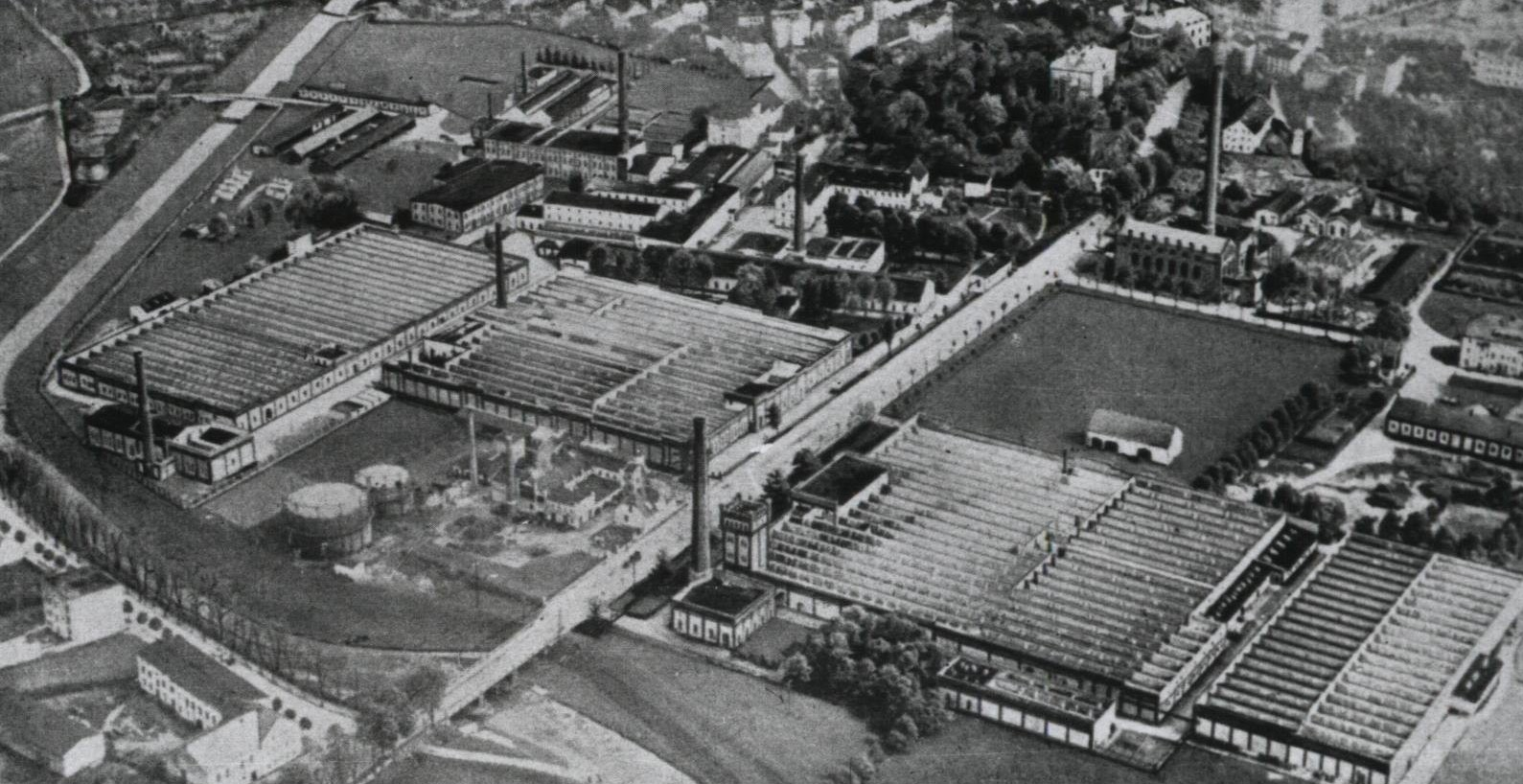
Samuel Fränkel's textile factory

Despite Prudnik being one of the biggest industrial centres of Upper Silesia, no workers' protests against capitalists were recorded to take place in the town, even during the Silesian weavers' uprising of 1844 and the Revolutions of 1848. In preparations to the January Uprising of 1863, the Central National Committee designated Prudnik as a "contact point" and a "weapons collection point". Poles carried out conspiratorial activities in the vicinity of the town. After the start of the uprising, controls on the border between Prussia and Austria were tightened. Everybody arriving in Prudnik had to report to the police, and the local military garrison was put on alert and took over the duties of units from nearby cities, as they were sent to guard the Prussian–Russian border. Three Polish soldiers from Prudnik took part in the January Uprising: Hieronim Olszewski, Piotr Linowski and Antoni Strogiński.

In 1876, Prudnik was connected with Nysa and Koźle via a railway line, and in 1896, a railway line between Prudnik and Gogolin started operating. In January 1898, the first social democratic conference of Upper Silesia took place in Prudnik.

=== Early 20th century ===
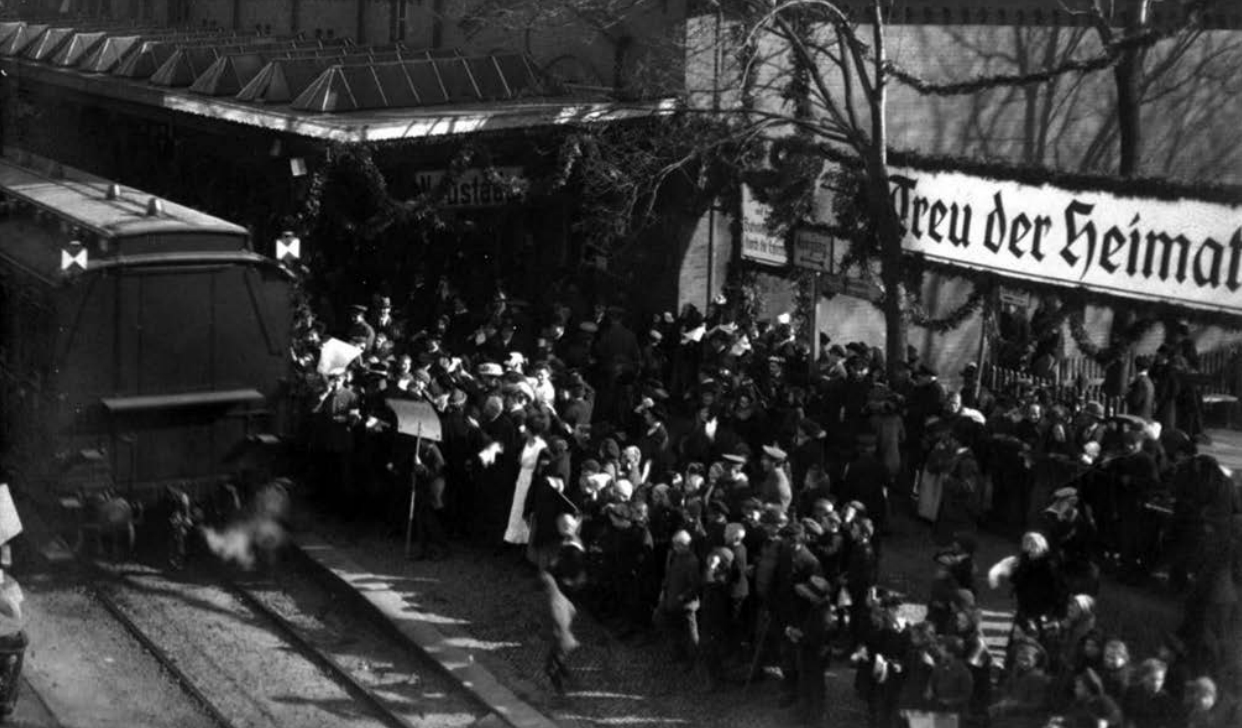
Arrival of a train with migrant workers from Western Germany in Prudnik during the 1921 plebiscite

At the beginning of the 20th century, a municipal bathhouse, a Town Park and military barracks were built in Prudnik. The town became a military garrison. The Polish minority was subject to Germanisation policies. Due to the lack of Polish schools, local Poles sent their children to schools in so-called Congress Poland in the Russian Partition of Poland. Local Polish activist, publicist and teacher Filip Robota, was investigated by the local Prussian administration and police for writing about this practice in the Gazeta Toruńska, a major Polish newspaper in the Prussian Partition of Poland. In July 1903, Prudnik and its surrounding area suffered a giant flood. One month later, Empress Augusta Victoria of Schleswig-Holstein visited Głuchołazy, Jarnołtówek and Prudnik to inspect places destroyed during the flood. She provided money for the construction of a water dam in Jarnołtówek. According to a 1 December 1910 census, among 18,864 inhabitants of Prudnik, 18,072 spoke German, 565 spoke Polish, 3 spoke a different language, and 224 were bilingual. During the First World War, a military hospital operated in the Fatebenefratelli monastery in Prudnik.

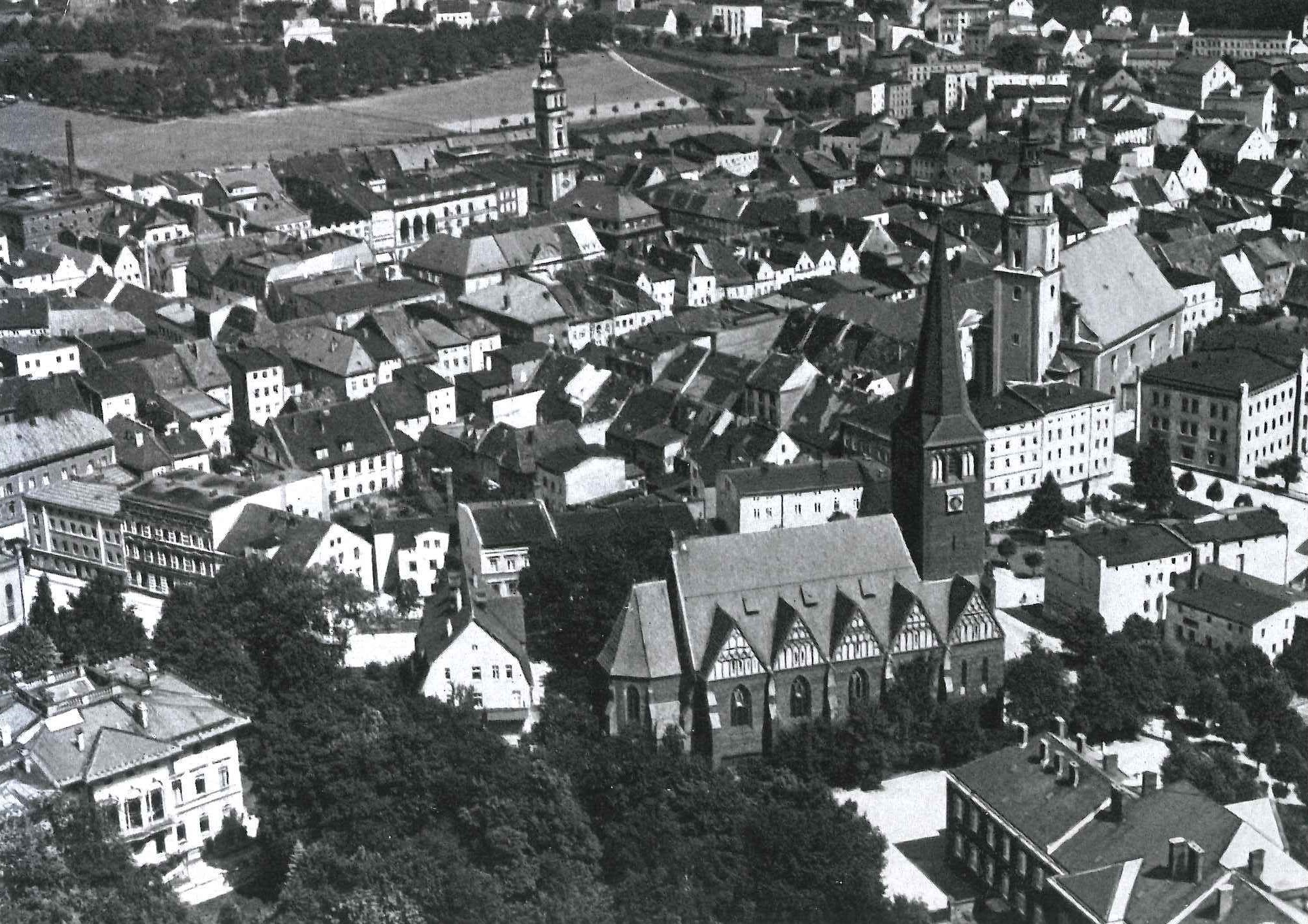
An aerial photograph of the town's centre in the 1930s

Prudnik remained part of Germany after Poland regained independence in 1918, however, Polish organizations still operated in the town in the interbellum, including the Union of Poles in Germany and the Polish-Catholic School Society. Polish Prime Minister Ignacy Jan Paderewski proposed to incorporate Prudnik into Poland in his unrealized political concept of the United States of Poland, which was presented to the US President Woodrow Wilson.

Only the eastern territory of the district of Prudnik was part of the 1921 Upper Silesia plebiscite. A Polish Plebiscite Committee was established in Prudnik, but over time it was moved to Głogówek and then to Strzeleczki, as its headquarters in Prudnik were demolished. Prudnik was a concentration place for German militias. The town housed a secret warehouse of military equipment for paramilitary units. It was a recruitment base for Freikorps troops. During the Silesian Uprisings, several Polish sabotage groups operated in Prudnik and its vicinity, with a goal of hindering German military operations. During the Third Silesian Uprising in 1921, a German kangaroo court operated in Prudnik. Poles convicted by the court were executed by shooting in a forest between Prudnik and Niemysłowice. Field hospitals for wounded soldiers and volunteers operated in the town.

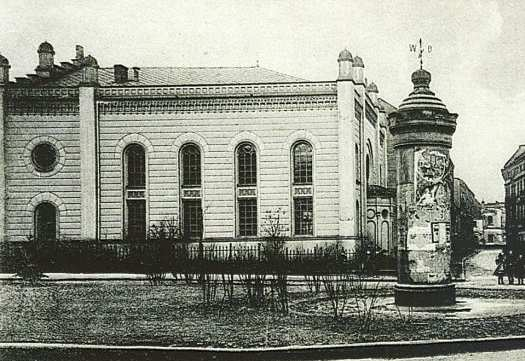
Prudnik Synagogue, burned down in 1938

In a secret Sicherheitsdienst report from 1934, Prudnik was named one of the main centers of the Polish movement in western Upper Silesia. Nazi Germany increasingly persecuted local Polish activists since 1937, and carried out mass arrests in August and September 1939. After the Munich Agreement, on 7 October 1938 Adolf Hitler arrived in Prudnik by train and then travelled to the Sudetenland. After visiting the Sudeten territories, he returned to Prudnik and went to Berlin by train. He was accompanied by Nazi officials and officers, including Hermann Göring, Heinrich Himmler, Gerd von Rundstedt, Erhard Milch and Hans-Jürgen Stumpff. During the Night of Broken Glass on 9–10 November 1938, Nazi militias burned down the local synagogue, founded in 1877 by Samuel Fränkel.

=== World War II ===
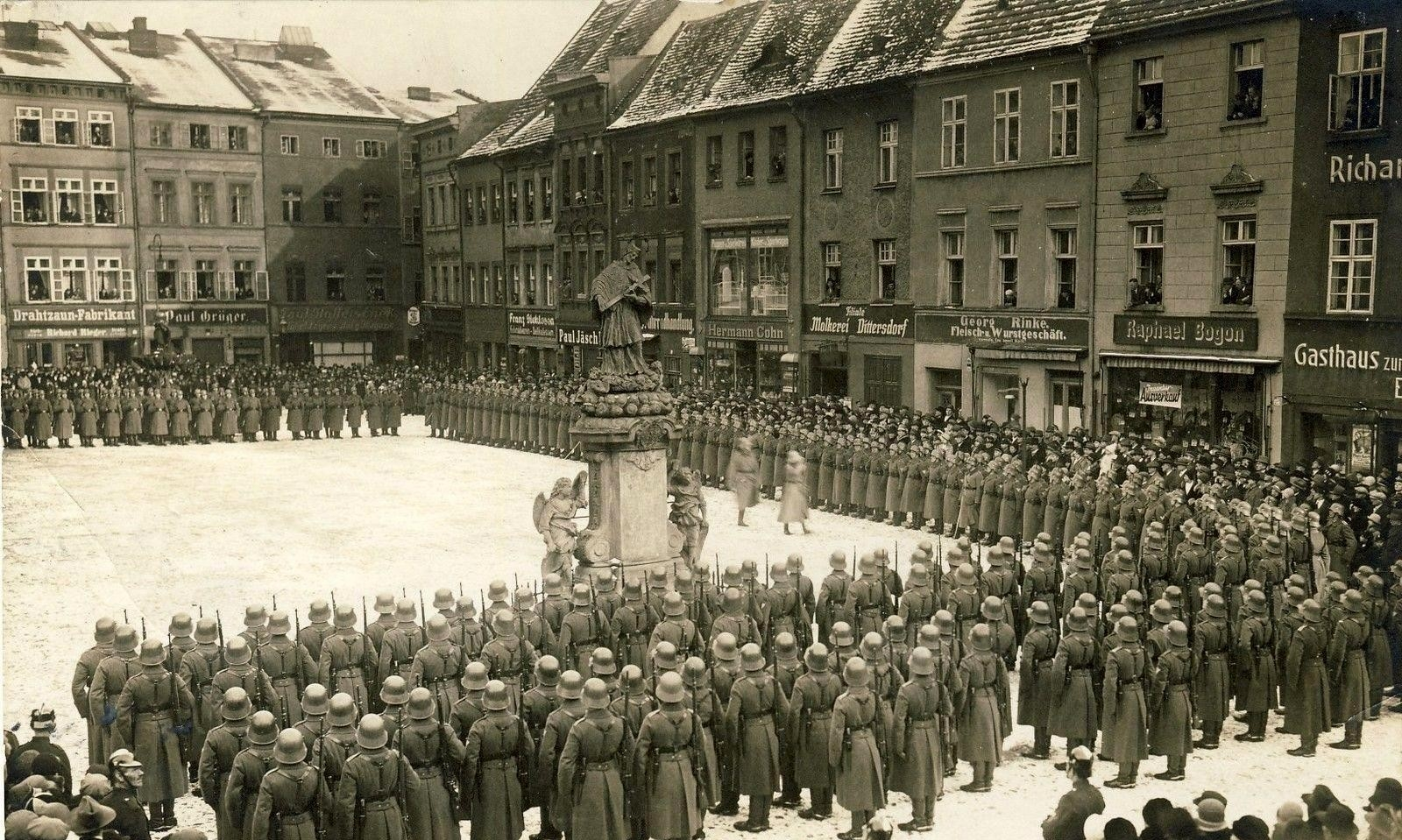
German army at the Market Square in Prudnik

During the Second World War, a military hospital was opened in the Fatebenefratelli monastery again, with subsidiaries in the building of a local school and in the Castle in nearby Moszna. The Germans established four forced labour camps and four working units for British and Soviet prisoners of war. On 26 September 1944, a subcamp of the Auschwitz concentration camp was founded in the Schlesische Feinweberei AG textile mill (now ZPB "Frotex"). Around 400 women, mostly from German-occupied Hungary, were imprisoned in the subcamp, and some died. In January 1945, the prisoners of the subcamp were evacuated by the Germans to the Gross-Rosen concentration camp in a death march. During the final months of the war, the town was also a stopping place of death marches of thousands of prisoners of several other subcamps of Auschwitz, and of Allied prisoners-of-war transferred by the Nazis from all over Europe to stalags built in occupied Poland. About 30,000 PoWs were force-marched westward across Poland, Czechoslovakia and Germany in winter conditions, lasting about four months from January to April 1945.

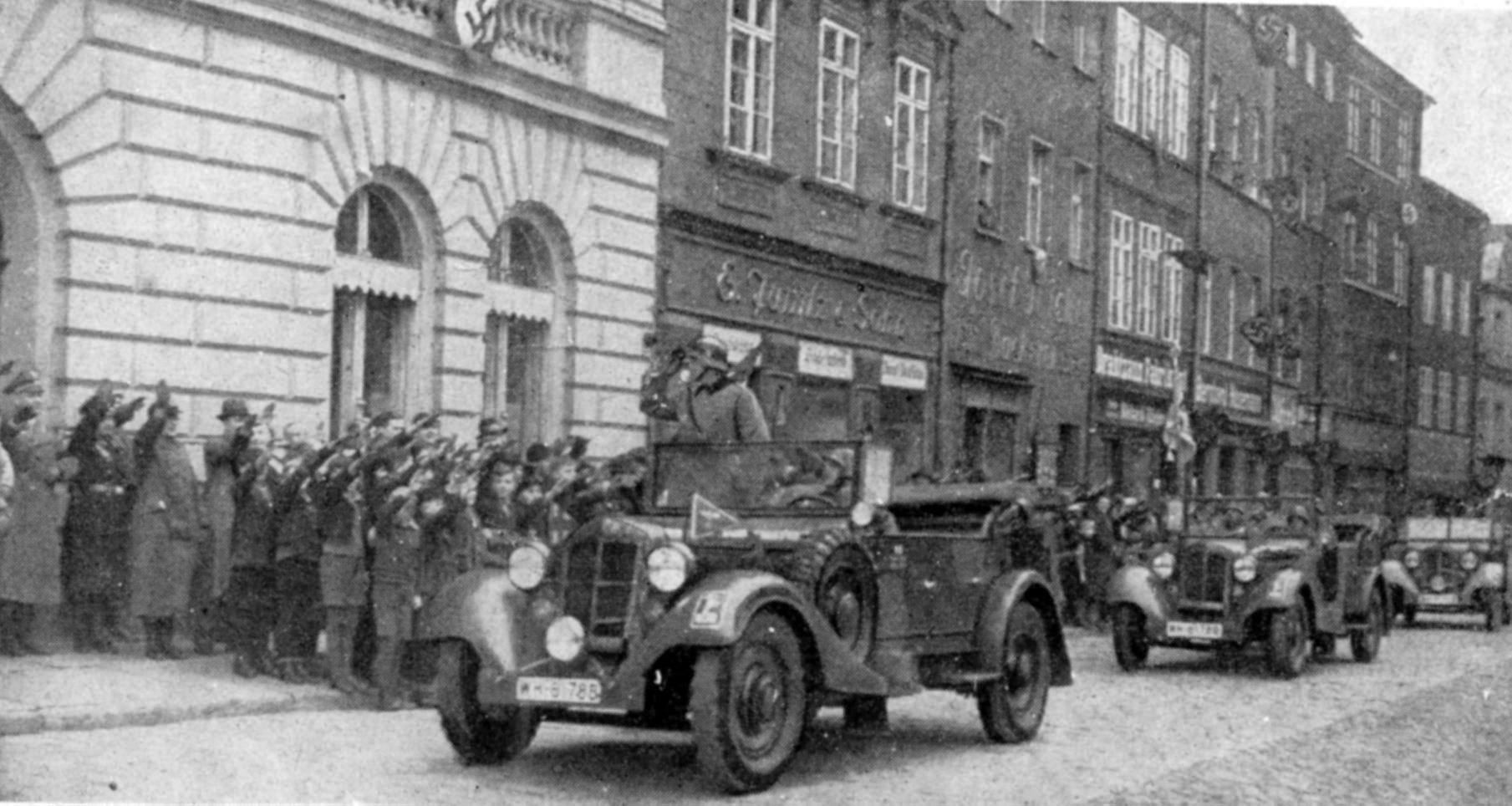
Nazi military parade at the Market Square

The Red Army started planning an attack on Prudnik in March 1945. It was supposed to be the most important part of the Upper Silesian offensive. The Soviets captured the town on 17 March 1945. In April of that year, the Red Army organised a ghetto for around 9,000 German inhabitants of the town. Prudnik remained on the frontline until May 1945, as German units stationed in close proximity to the town. Around 200 thousand soldiers took part in fighting for the town. On 23 April 1945, the Market Square, Parish Square and Castle Square were bombarded by the Soviet airforce. However, it is not known whether the bombing was intentional. According to a local priest Franz Pietsch, the bombardment was caused by drunk Russians shooting out incorrect light signals.

Around 15% of the buildings in Prudnik were destroyed during the war, including the Nativity of the Virgin Mary Sanctuary and the Schwedenschanze tourist shelter. The northern part of the Market Square with Town Hall was heavily damaged.

=== In communist Poland ===
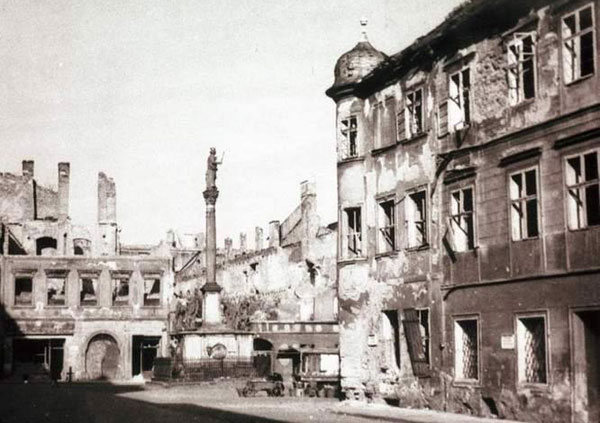
Market Square following the end of World War II

Polish administration took over civil rule in the Prudnik County on 11 May 1945. A part of Poles from the Eastern Borderlands were relocated to the Prudnik and its surrounding area. Specifically, people from Nadwórna (now Nadvirna, Ukraine), the area of Tarnopol (now Ternopil), settled in the town, along with immigrants from Central Poland and people relocated from Czerniowce (now Chernivtsi, Ukraine). The majority of the German inhabitants of the town were expelled to Germany, however, unlike other parts of the so-called Recovered Territories, the surrounding region's indigenous population remained and was not forcibly expelled as elsewhere.

The first name given to the town under Polish administration was Prądnik. It was changed to Prudnik on 7 May 1946. The change was preceded by months of debate in the local press, and at one point both names were in use simultaneously. The first Polish mayor of the town was Antoni Błaszczyński, and the first starosta was Józef Sopa. The Red Army terrorised the local population by robbing people and raping women, including children. On 3 June 1945, Czechoslovak militia from Zlaté Hory arrived in Prudnik and captured the local Town Hall, announcing that the town belongs to Czechoslovakia. Polish soldiers convinced the Czechs to leave without a firefight.

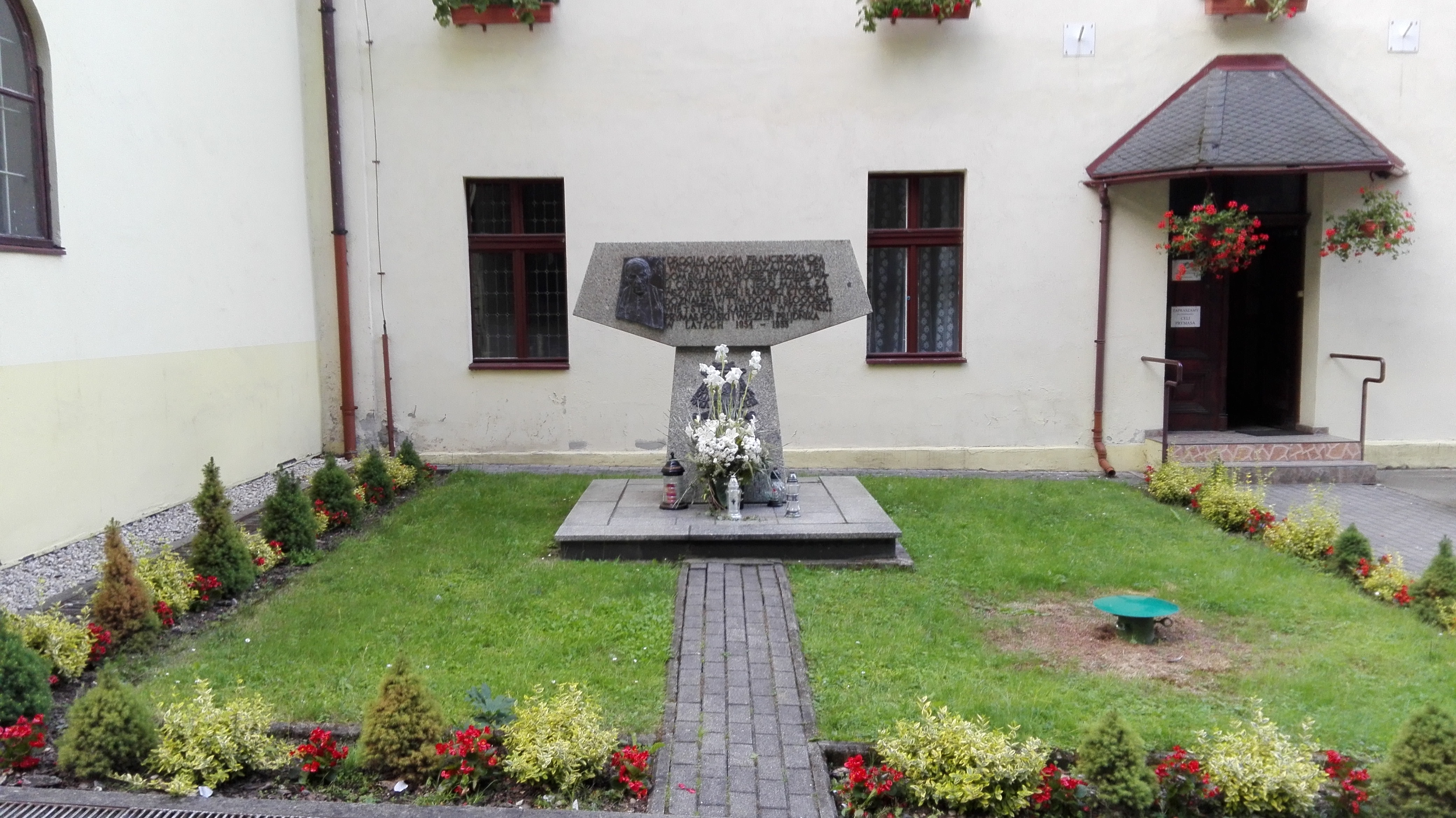
A monument to Stefan Wyszyński at the place of his imprisonment

Since 1945 to 1956, a Security Office was located at the Klasztorna Street in Prudnik. An anti-communist military organization Underground Home Army operated in the town and its vicinity. Since 6 October 1954 to 27 October 1955, cardinal Stefan Wyszyński was imprisoned in the Franciscan monastery in Prudnik.

The Museum of Prudnik Region and the Prudnik Forest District were founded in 1959. In the years 1964–1974, the Nowotki housing estate (since 1990 the Wyszyńskiego housing estate) was built in the southern part of the town. In the 1970s, the Jasionowe Wzgórze housing estate was built in the eastern part of town. In August 1977, Prudnik and its surrounding area were hit by a flood caused by heavy rainfall. The flood wave destroyed a railway bridge at Słowicza Street.

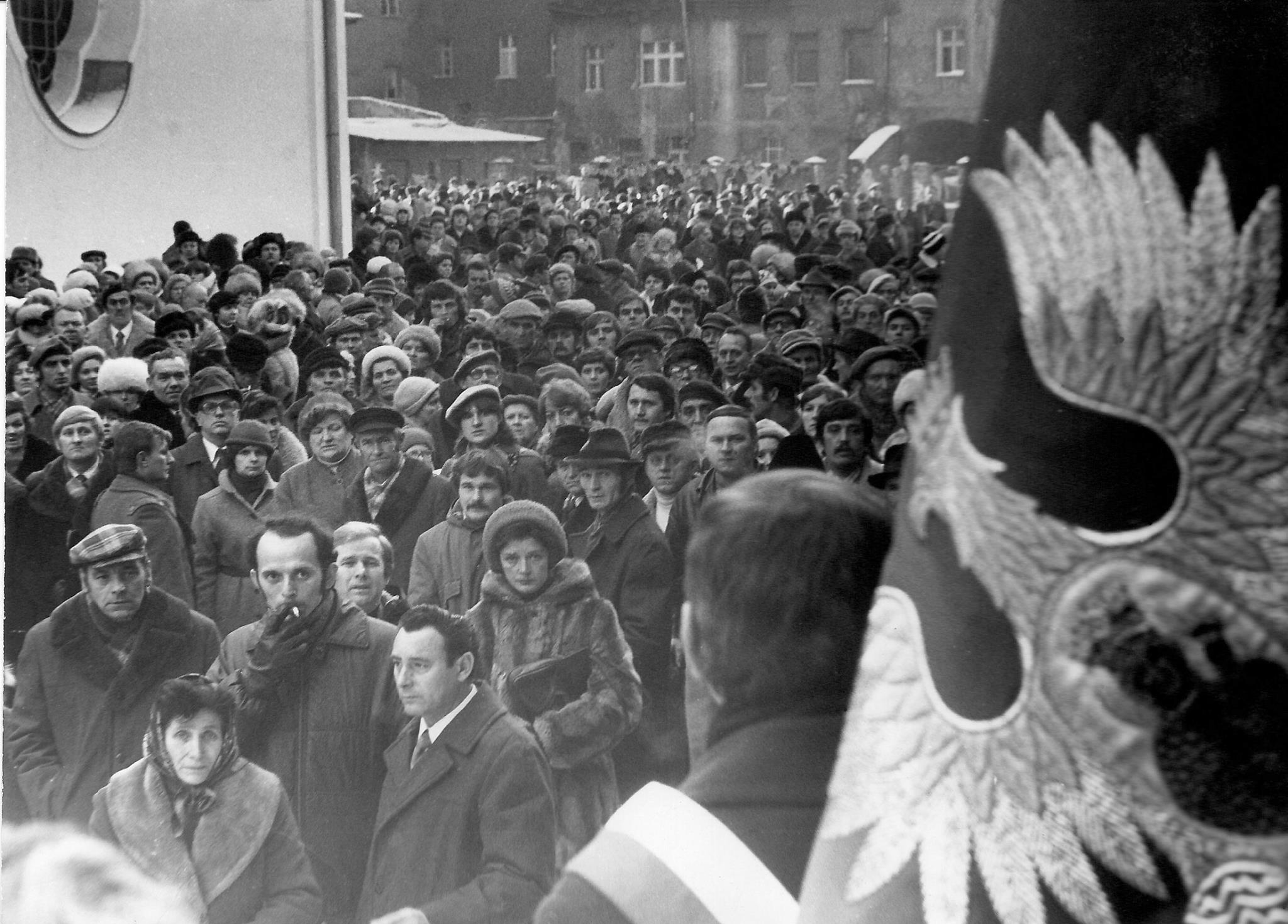
Anti-communist demonstrations in Prudnik, 1981

In September 1980, 1,500 workers of ZPB "Frotex" and firefighters from the factory's fire brigade went on the biggest anti-communist strike in Opole Voivodeship. The strike lasted 5 days (5–10 September). Other factories in the town also went on strikes.

=== In modern Poland ===
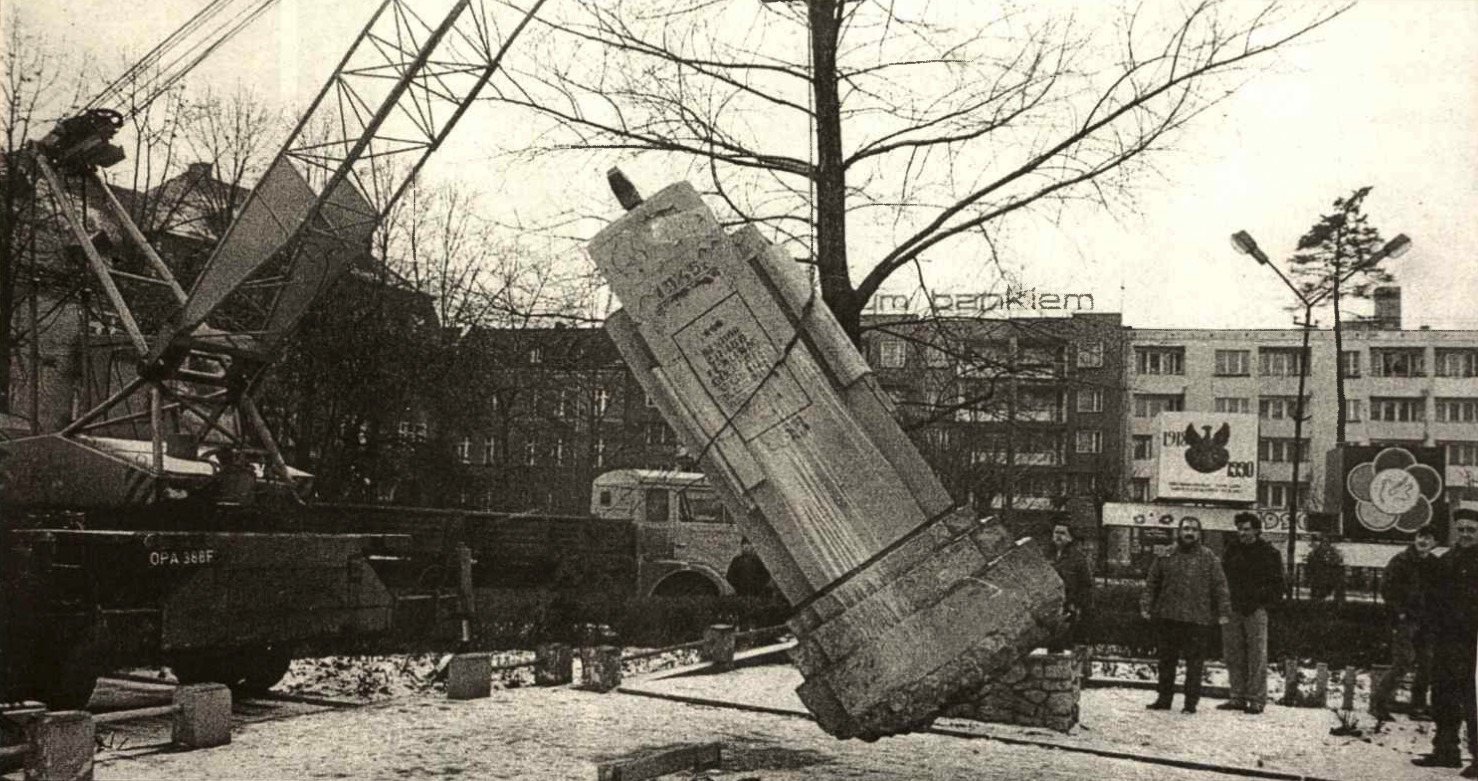
Removal of the Red Army monument from the Wolności Square, 1990

After the first elections to local self-government in Poland after its restoration in 1990, Jan Roszkowski became the mayor of Prudnik. In December 1990, a monument to the Red Army was removed from the Wolności Square. A monument to Polish soldiers was erected in its place in 1996. The military garrison of Prudnik was liquidated in May 1994. In June 1997, the municipal sewage treatment plant at Poniatowskiego Street was put into operation.

Prudnik was the first town in Poland to be flooded during the July 1997 Central European flood. Water from the Złoty Potok river destroyed the pedestrian bridge at Kościuszki Street. The streets of Kochanowskiego, Morcinka, Chrobrego, Batorego, Powstańców Śląskich, Kolejowa, Ogrodowa, Nyska, as well as numerous industrial plants were flooded by water from the Prudnik river. In total, 192 people were evacuated from the town and surrounding villages.

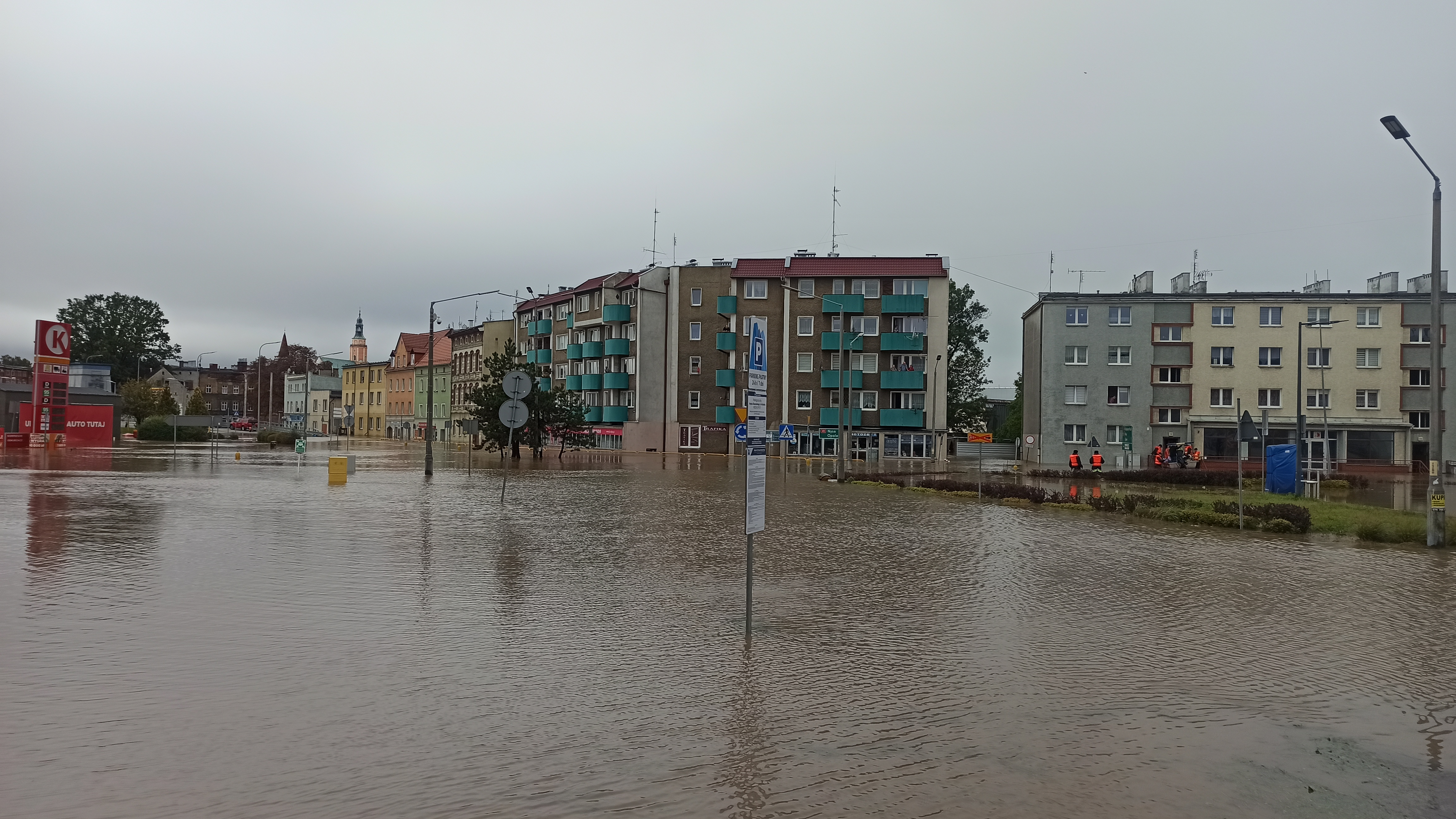
The 2024 flood in Prudnik

In 2007 and 2014, two of the biggest factories in the town were shut down: Prudnickie Zakłady Obuwia "Primus" and Zakłady Przemysłu Bawełnianego "Frotex". In 2009, the local castle tower, known as "Wok's Tower", was renovated and adapted into a scenic viewpoint. On 20 June 2015, Prudnik joined the Cittaslow International organisation.

Prudnik was flooded during the 2024 Central European floods. The water destroyed several elements of the town's historical architecture and three pedestrian bridges. Two industrial plants and sports infrastructure were flooded.

== Geography ==
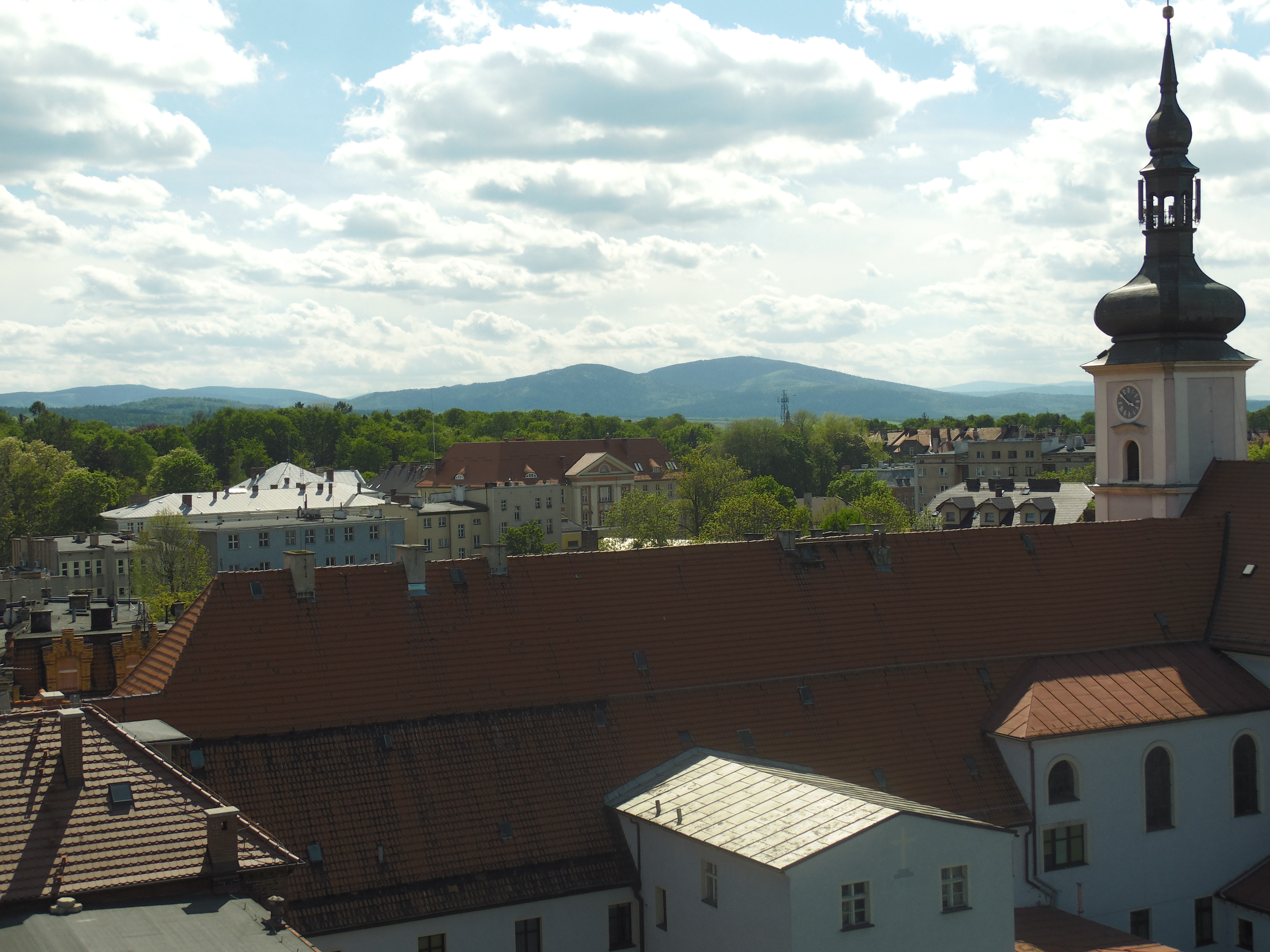
Biskupia Kopa seen from the Castle Tower in Prudnik

Prudnik lies in the south-western part of Poland, in the Opole Voivodeship. It is a seat of the Prudnik County and Gmina Prudnik. It is the capital and the largest town of the Prudnik Land historical region. The other towns of the Prudnik Land are Biała, Głogówek and Strzeleczki. Along with nearby Vrbno pod Pradědem in the Czech Republic, Prudnik is a capital of Euroregion Praděd. Originally belonging to Moravia, the town has been a part of the historical region of Silesia (Upper Silesia) since 1337.

Prudnik is situated 50 kilometres (31 mi) away from Opole, 86 kilometres (53 mi) away from Ostrava, 107 kilometres (66 mi) away from Wrocław, 115 kilometres (71 mi) away from Katowice, 263 kilometres (163 mi) away from Prague, 284 kilometres (176 mi) away from Bratislava, 289 kilometres (180 mi) away from Vienna and 356 kilometres (221 mi) away from Warsaw.

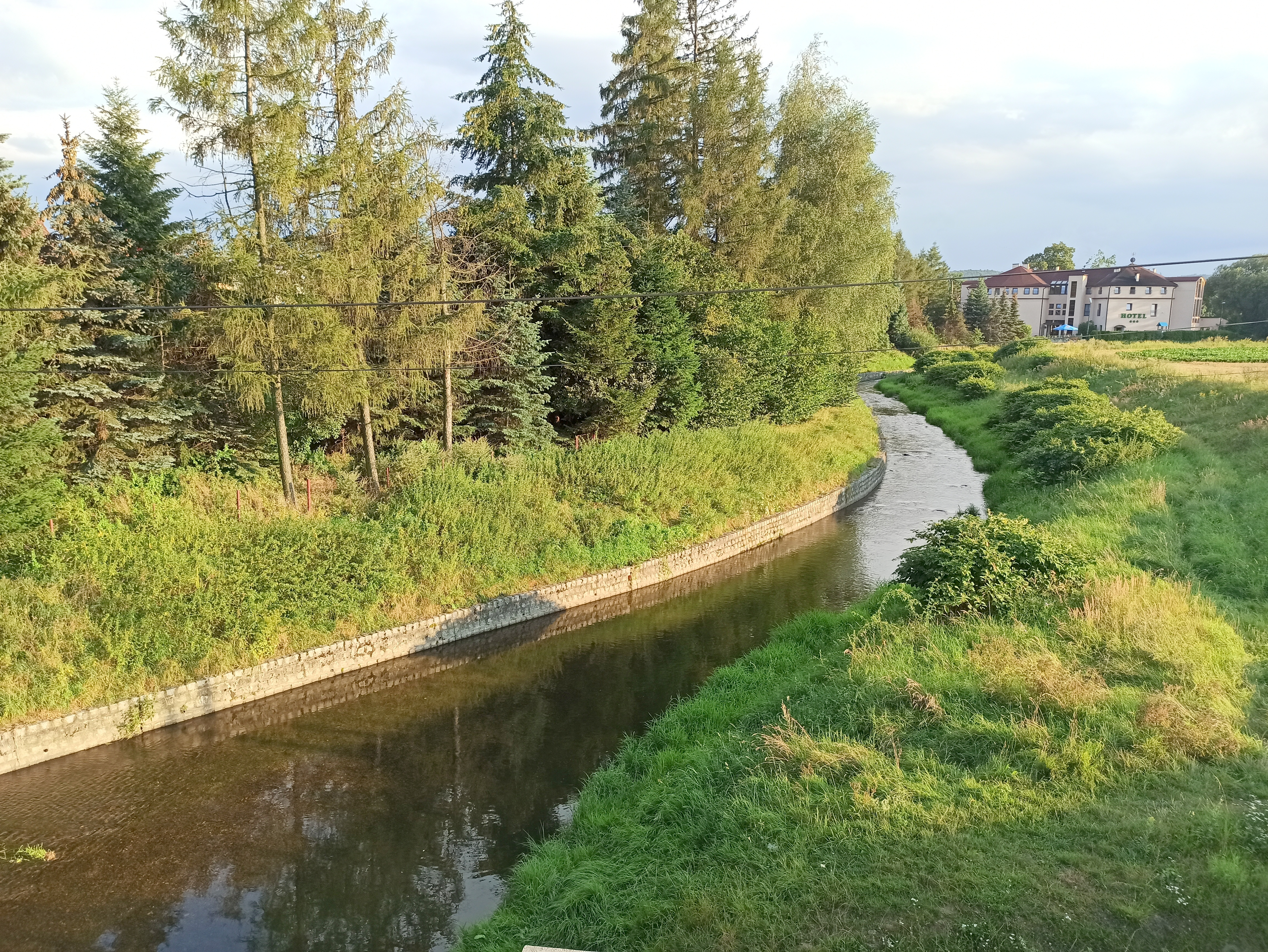
Złoty Potok River

The town is located at the borderline between the Silesian Lowlands and the Opawskie Mountains (Eastern Sudetes). According to Krzysztof Badora's 2017 physical and geographical division of Opole Voivodeship, Prudnik is situated in four microregions: Prudnik Valley (Dolina Prudnika), Prudnik Depression (Obniżenie Prudnickie), Głuchołazy–Prudnik Foreland (Przedgórze Głuchołasko-Prudnickie) and Długota Mountains (Wzgórza Długockie). The town lies at the confluence of the Prudnik river and its Złoty Potok tributary.

There are several mountains within the administrative boundaries of the town: Czyżykowa Góra, Kapliczna Góra, Kozia Góra, Okopowa, Szubieniczna Góra, Święta Góra, Wróblik. The town's lowest elevation is situated at 238 metres (781 ft), and the highest elevation is at 403 metres (1,322 ft).

Climate data for Prudnik (1991–2021)
Month	Jan	Feb	Mar	Apr	May	Jun	Jul	Aug	Sep	Oct	Nov	Dec	Year
Mean daily maximum °C (°F)	0.7 (33.3)	2.4 (36.3)	7.1 (44.8)	13.4 (56.1)	17.7 (63.9)	20.8 (69.4)	22.9 (73.2)	22.9 (73.2)	18.1 (64.6)	12.8 (55.0)	7.5 (45.5)	2.5 (36.5)	12.4 (54.3)
Daily mean °C (°F)	−1.7 (28.9)	0.6 (33.1)	3.2 (37.8)	8.8 (47.8)	13.5 (56.3)	16.9 (62.4)	18.9 (66.0)	18.7 (65.7)	14.2 (57.6)	9.5 (49.1)	5 (41)	0.2 (32.4)	9 (48)
Mean daily minimum °C (°F)	−4.4 (24.1)	−3.7 (25.3)	−0.7 (30.7)	3.9 (39.0)	8.7 (47.7)	12.3 (54.1)	14.3 (57.7)	14.1 (57.4)	10.3 (50.5)	6.3 (43.3)	2.6 (36.7)	−2.2 (28.0)	5.1 (41.2)
Average precipitation mm (inches)	53 (2.1)	46 (1.8)	62 (2.4)	69 (2.7)	99 (3.9)	114 (4.5)	133 (5.2)	99 (3.9)	87 (3.4)	58 (2.3)	56 (2.2)	54 (2.1)	930 (36.5)
Average precipitation days	9	8	10	9	11	11	11	10	9	8	8	9	113
Average relative humidity (%)	83	81	76	69	71	71	71	70	74	79	83	82	75.8
Source: climate-data.org

== Government and politics ==
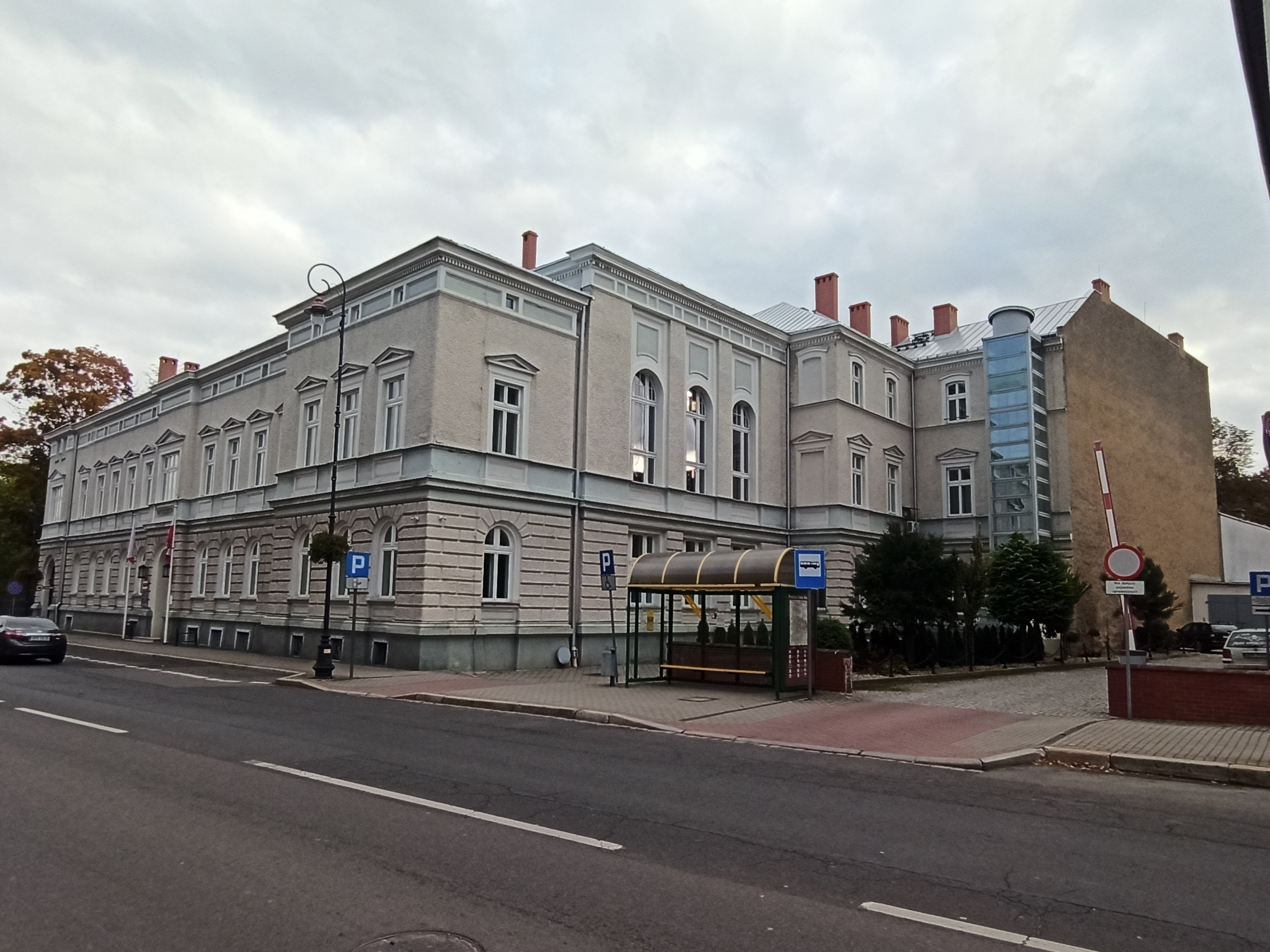
Prudnik Town Hall – the seat of the town mayor

Prudnik is a seat of the urban-rural Gmina Prudnik (Prudnik Commune) and of Prudnik County. The town is also a capital of Euroregion Praděd.

Prudnik is currently governed by the town's mayor and a municipal legislature known as the town council. The town council is made up of 21 councilors and is directly elected by the town and gmina's inhabitants. The town's current mayor, re-elected for his second term in 2024, is Grzegorz Zawiślak.

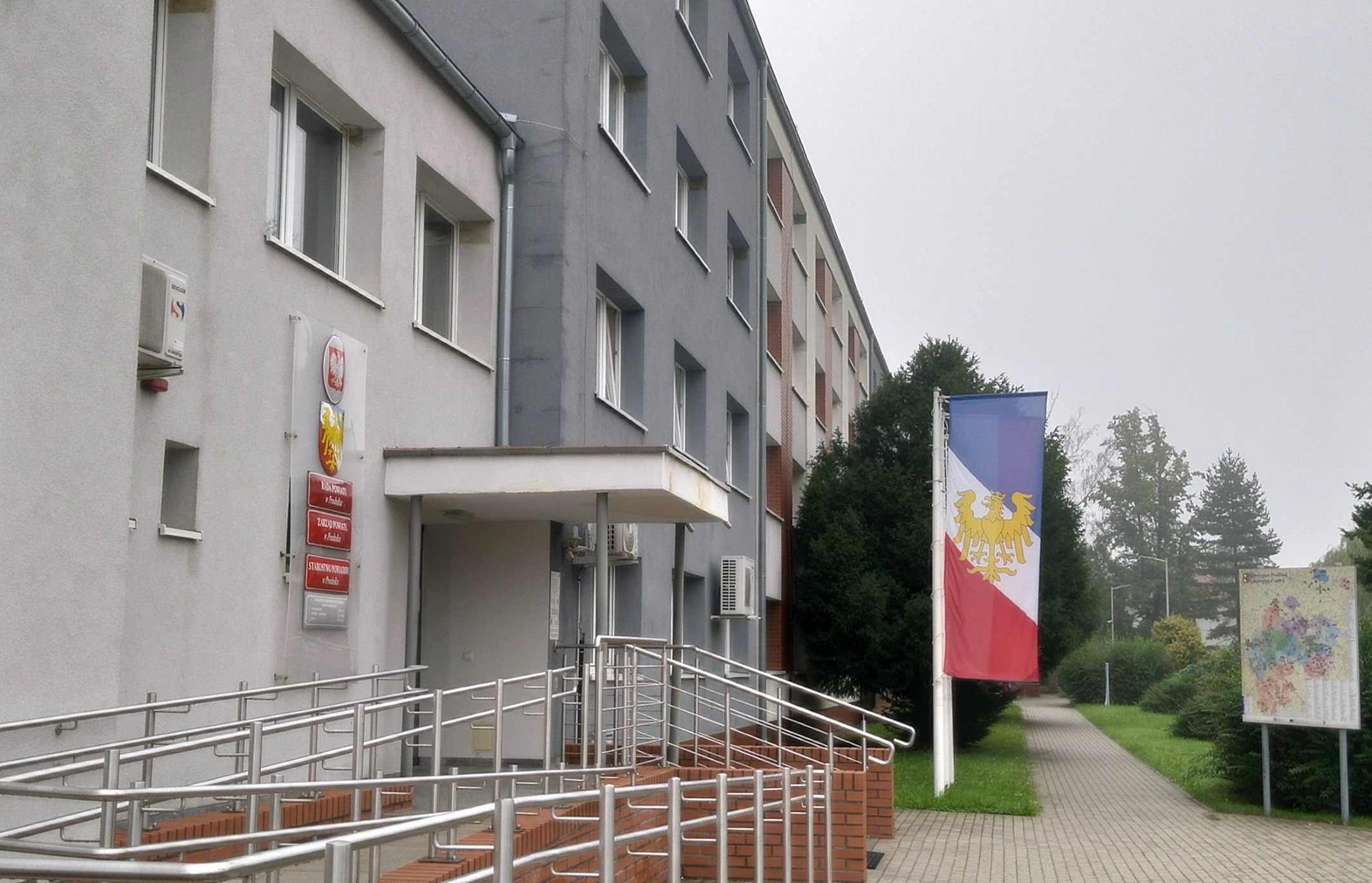
Prudnik County's administrative offices

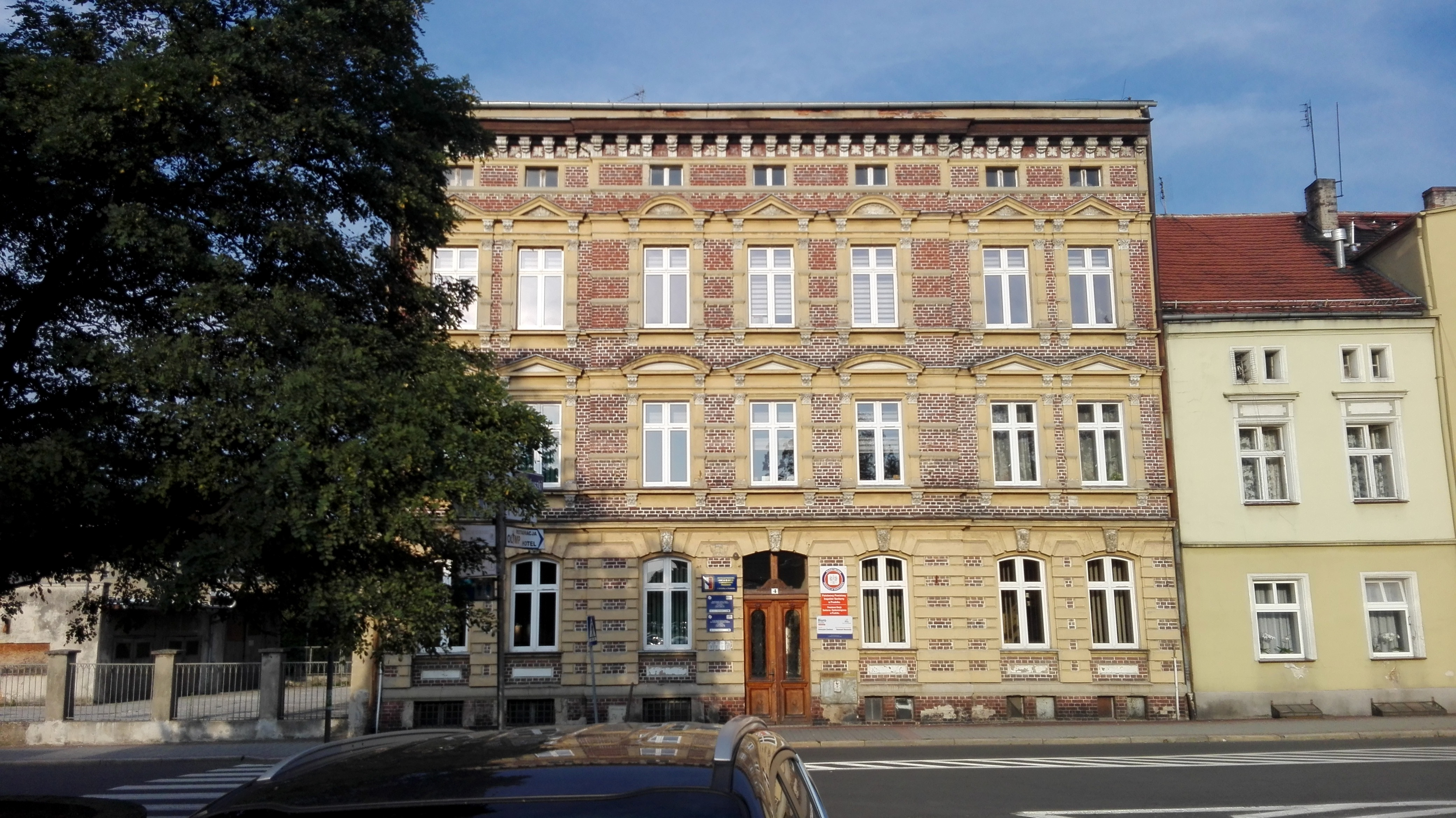
Euroregion Praděd's headquarters

== Economy ==
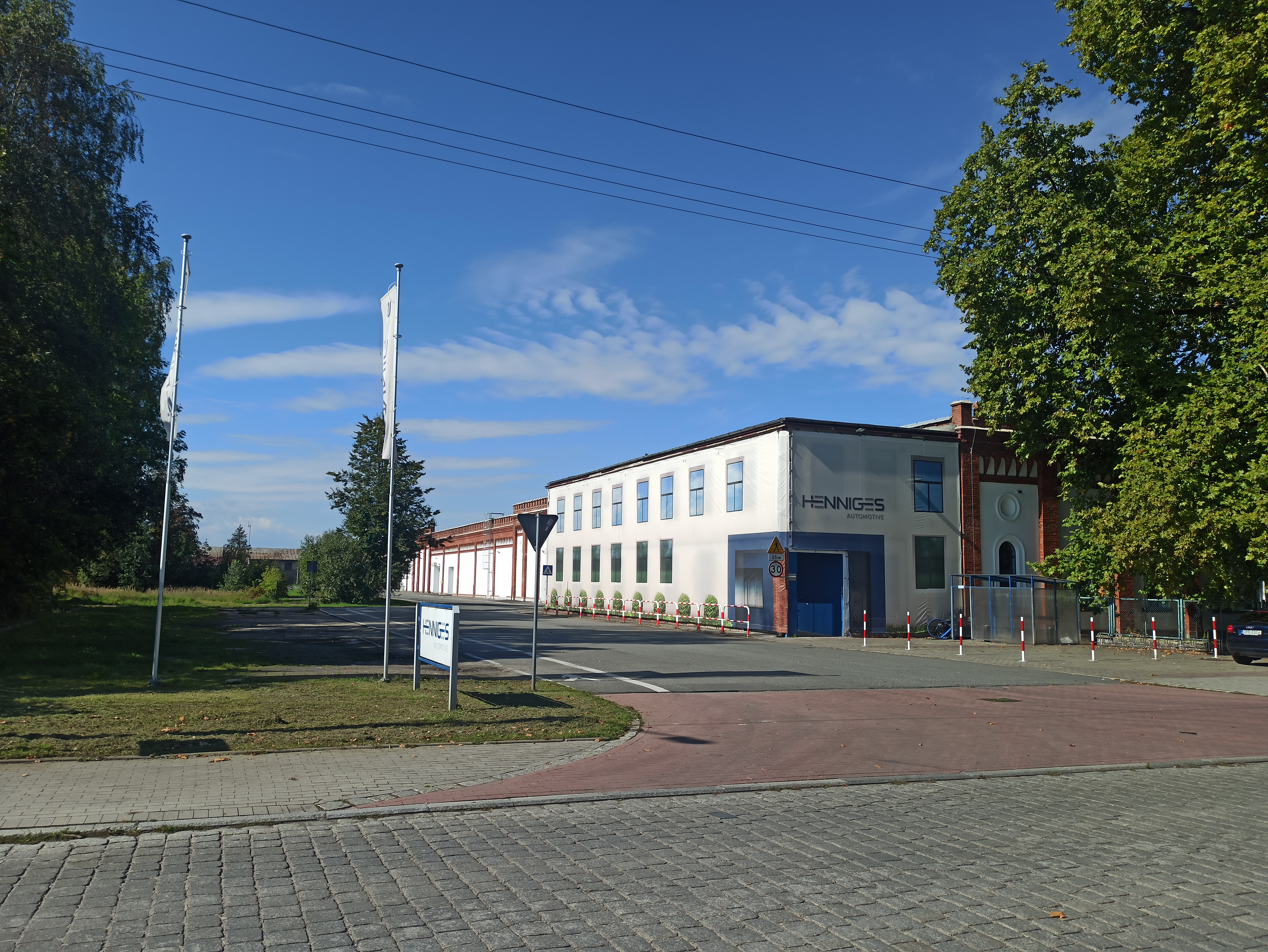
Henniges Automotive

Historically, Prudnik was a hub of textile, footwear and wood industries. Currently, the town is home to automotive, wood/furniture, metal, lighting, glass processing, construction and agriculture sectors. As of 2023, there were 13 industrial plants in Prudnik that were classified as "big companies": Henniges Automotive, Steinpol Central Services, Spółdzielnia "Pionier", Moretto Group, Woisch, Torkonstal, Furnika, Diversa, Wa-Bet, Stryi, TaBet, Bardusch and Stadnina Koni Prudnik.

The first significant textile factories in the city were established in the 1820s. The largest enterprise in Prudnik, which was also one of the largest textile manufacturers in the world, was a factory founded in 1845 by Samuel Fränkel, known after 1945 as Zakłady Przemysłu Bawełnianego "Frotex". In its heyday, "Frotex" employed 4,000 people, and the company's activities contributed significantly to the development of the town. It was the largest producer of terry towels in Poland. In 2011, "Frotex" was declared bankrupt, and Prudnik's textile industry came to an end.

By the end of the 19th century, seven shoe factories were established in the town. Along with Pirmasens and Borne, Prudnik was a leading centre of shoe production in Germany. In 1945, the footwear factories of Prudnik were merged into one enterprise, known as Prudnickie Zakłady Obuwia "Primus" since 1952. The factory employed almost 2,000 people, making it the second most important employer in the city after "Frotex". "Primus", affected by the economic changes of 1989, was shut down in 2007.

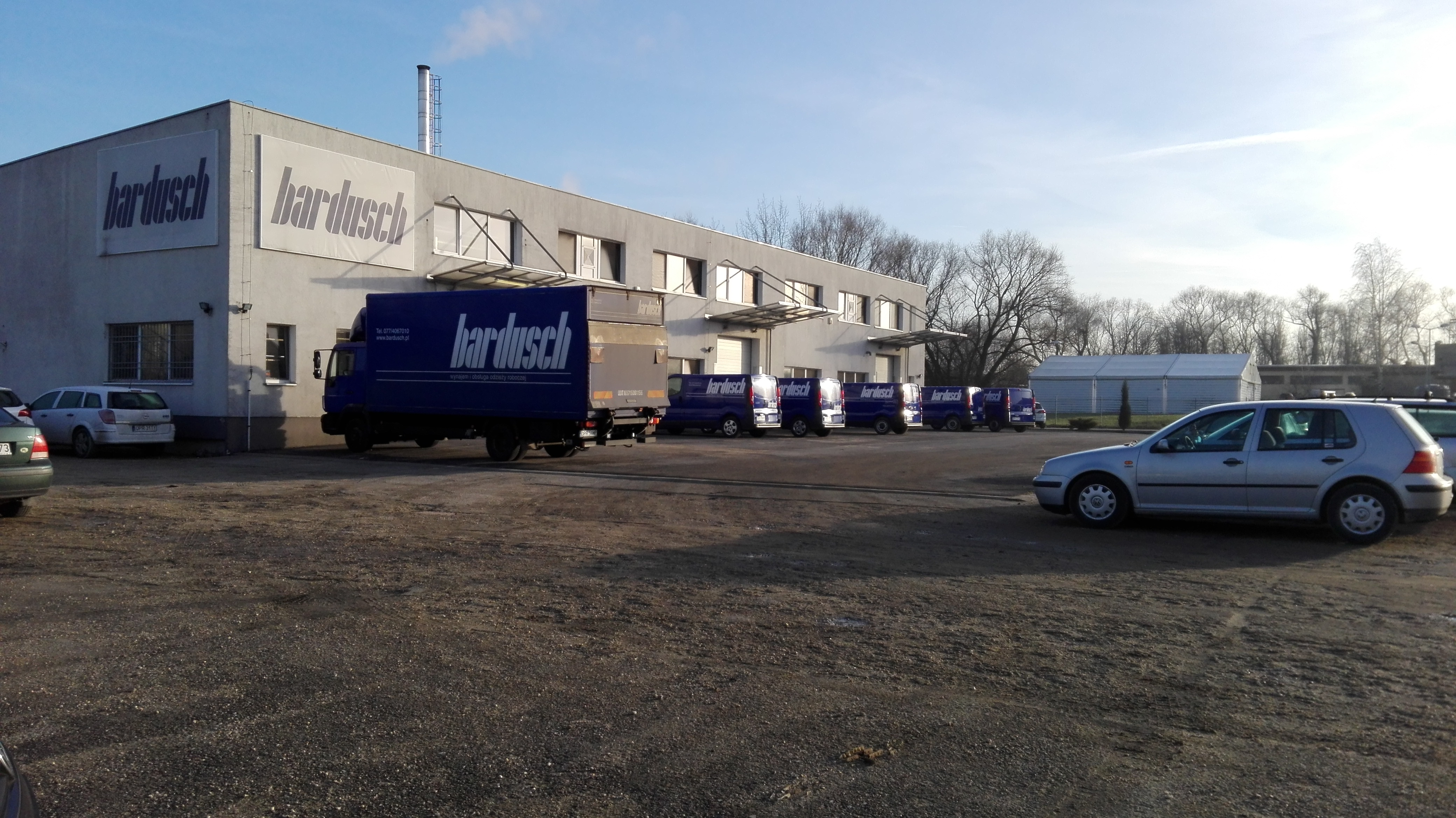
Bardusch Polska

In 1998, the German company Bardusch opened its plant in Prudnik, servicing and renting workwear for companies in the food, electronics, chemical and automotive industries. It was one of the first Western companies to open its plants in Prudnik after 1989. The headquarters and main plant of Bardusch Polska are located in Prudnik, employing about 100 people.

Spółdzielnia Pracy Różnej Wytwórczości i Usług "Ogniwo", founded in Prudnik in 1947, produced equipment elements for cars manufactured in FSC Lublin, ZSD Nysa, FSM and FSC Star. "Ogniwo" was shut down in 1998. Another factory, Spółdzielnia "Pionier", founded in 1951, has been producing plastic and metal products for the automotive market since 1965. "Pionier" supplies components to brands such as: Ford, Fiat, Volkswagen, Bentley, Toyota, Audi, Lancia, BMW, Mini, Peugeot, Porsche, Citroën, Suzuki, Volvo, Saab, Hyundai and Abarth. It is the largest sheltered workshop in Opole Voivodeship. In 2016, an American automotive manufacturing company, Henniges Automotive, opened its plant in Prudnik. It is a producer of anti-vibration components and encapsulated glass systems. At the end of 2017, the Henniges Automotive plant in Prudnik employed about 150 people.

Dairy cooperative Okręgowa Spółdzielnia Mleczarska was founded in 1946. It owned plants in Ścinawa Mała, Głogówek and Łambinowice. 80% of the dairy's products were delivered to retail chains operating on the Polish market. In 2023, the dairy cooperative of Prudnik was declared bankrupt. In 2010, a service and storage hall was built in Prudnik for the Cream company, which deals with servicing equipment and production lines in bakeries and confectioneries.

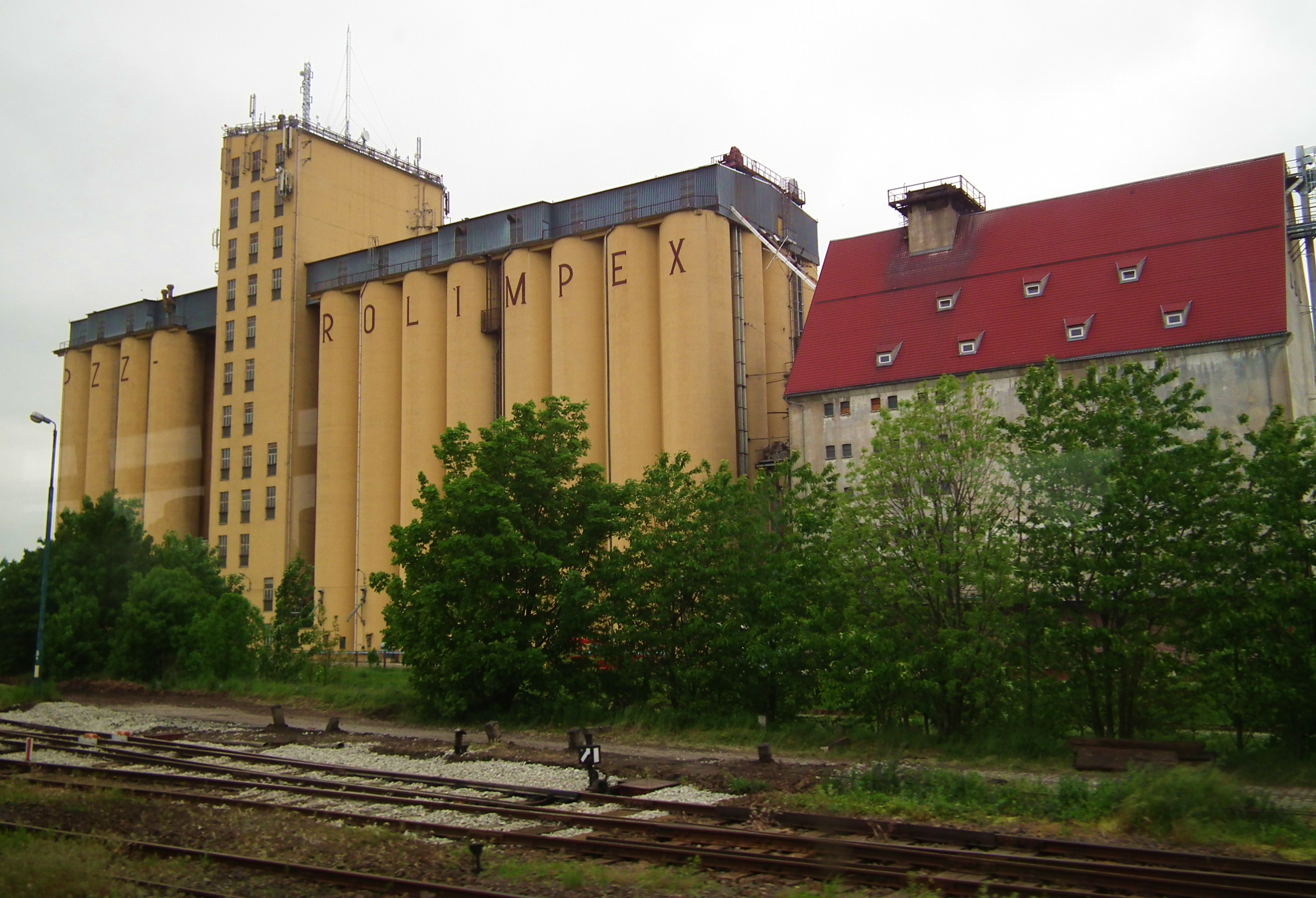
Grain elevator

In the communist era, a State Agricultural Farm operated in Prudnik. Since 1994, it functions as a private limited company under the name of Stadnina Koni Prudnik. The company engages in breeding sport horses, breeding and raising cattle, crop production, and horse riding lessons. On the northern outskirts of Prudnik there is a 100-meter-tall grain elevator used for cleaning, sorting and storing grain with a capacity of approximately 1,000 cubic metres (1,300 cu yd).

In 1978, the Diversa company began its operations as a manufacturer of aquariums. Since 1996, the Artech Polska plant, part of the French Armor group, has been operating in Prudnik. It manufactures printer cartridges. In 2000, a branch of Steinpol Central Services, owned by Steinhoff International, was founded, producing upholstered furniture. By the road that leads from Prudnik to Dębowiec, there is a quarry, which belongs to Kopalnie Odkrywkowe Surowców Drogowych of Niemodlin. Torkonstal, a manufacturer of metal containers and bins, was established as the property of Gmina Prudnik. It was privatized in 2007. Furnika, which produces LED lighting for furniture, moved to Prudnik from Nysa in 2014. Moretto, an Italian manufacturer of automated systems for plastics processing, also operates in the town. In 2024, the Wood of Fire company, which produces wood fired using the top charring technique, was established in Prudnik.

The Industrial District was designated in the northern part of Prudnik in 1989. In 2009, the "Prudnik Subzone" of the Wałbrzych Special Economic Zone was designated on 12 hectares (30 acres) of land in the Industrial District. The area, expanded to 20 hectares (49 acres), was taken over by the Katowice Special Economic Zone (Gliwice Subzone). The zone is located at Przemysłowa and Meblarska streets, near the city’s northern bypass.

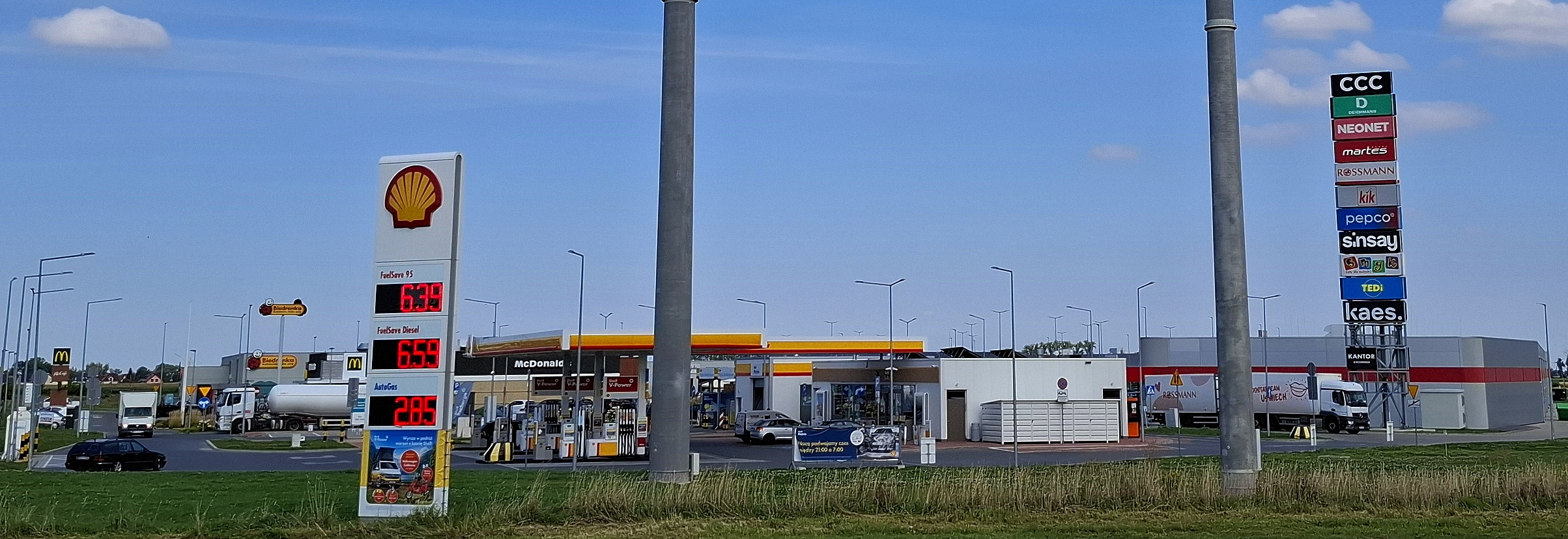
M Park Prudnik shopping mall

In 2013, the Czerwona Torebka retail chain opened its shopping arcade by the Skowrońskiego Street in Prudnik. In 2021, in the immediate vicinity of the buildings of Prudnik, in the area belonging to Gmina Lubrza, the Premium Park shopping center was opened. It was acquired by the British company London & Cambridge Properties Ltd. and changed its name to M Park Prudnik. It is a major shopping mall for the southern part of Opole Voivodeship. Among the businesses located in the mall is a McDonald's fast-food restaurant. In the years 2024–2025, a shopping mall by the Sybiraków and Podgórna streets was constructed.

== Transport ==
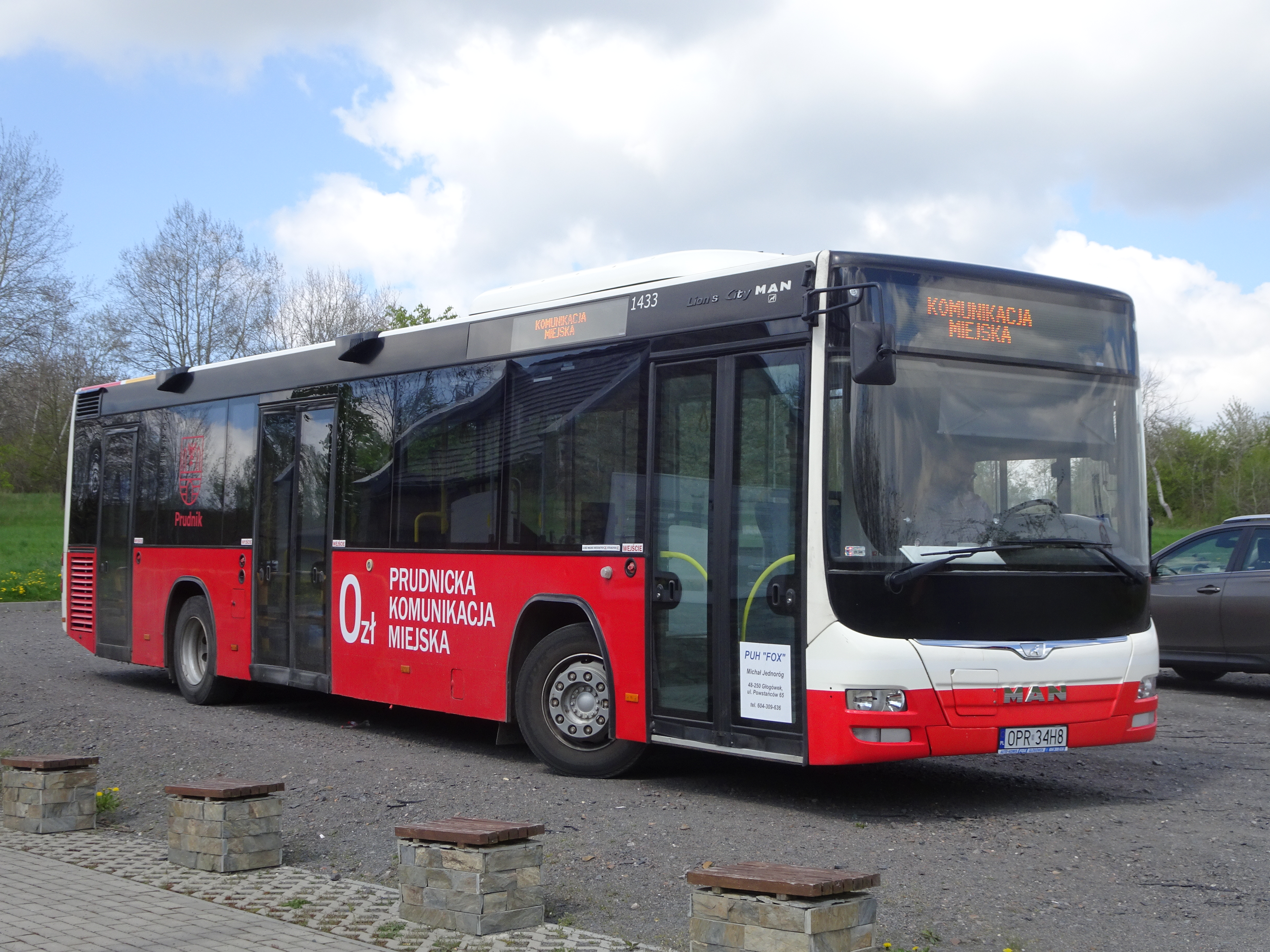
A public transit bus in Prudnik

Prudnik is situated at the crossroad of important routes. A communication route from Northern to Southern Europe runs through the town. National road 40, which leads from Głuchołazy to Pyskowice, runs through Prudnik. National road 41, starting in Nysa, ends at a border crossing with the Czech Republic near Prudnik, in the village of Trzebina. Voivodeship road 414 connects Prudnik to the region's capital of Opole.

Prudnik is a railway node. The Prudnik railway station is situated by the Dworcowa Street. The station is situated on the Katowice–Legnica railway (rail line number 137), which connects Upper and Lower Silesia regions. Additionally, the Krapkowice–Prudnik railway (rail line number 306) ends at the station in Prudnik. Railway connections are available to cities and towns such as: Brzeg, Gliwice, Jelenia Góra, Katowice, Kędzierzyn-Koźle, Kłodzko, Kraków, Nysa, Wałbrzych, Zabrze.

The bus station in Prudnik is situated at the Kościuszki Street, in the town's center. It was modernised in 2023. A public transport bus service operates in the town. Since 2022, the use of public transit in Prudnik is free of charge for all passengers. Long-distance bus connections are operated by local Motor Transport Companies.

Prudnik has a developed bike infrastructure with a network of bicycle routes connected with tourist paths in the Czech Republic. Long-distance bicycle routes connect Prudnik with Pokrzywna and Moszna, popular tourist destinations.

== Demographics ==
As of 2016, the town of Prudnik had a population of 21,368.

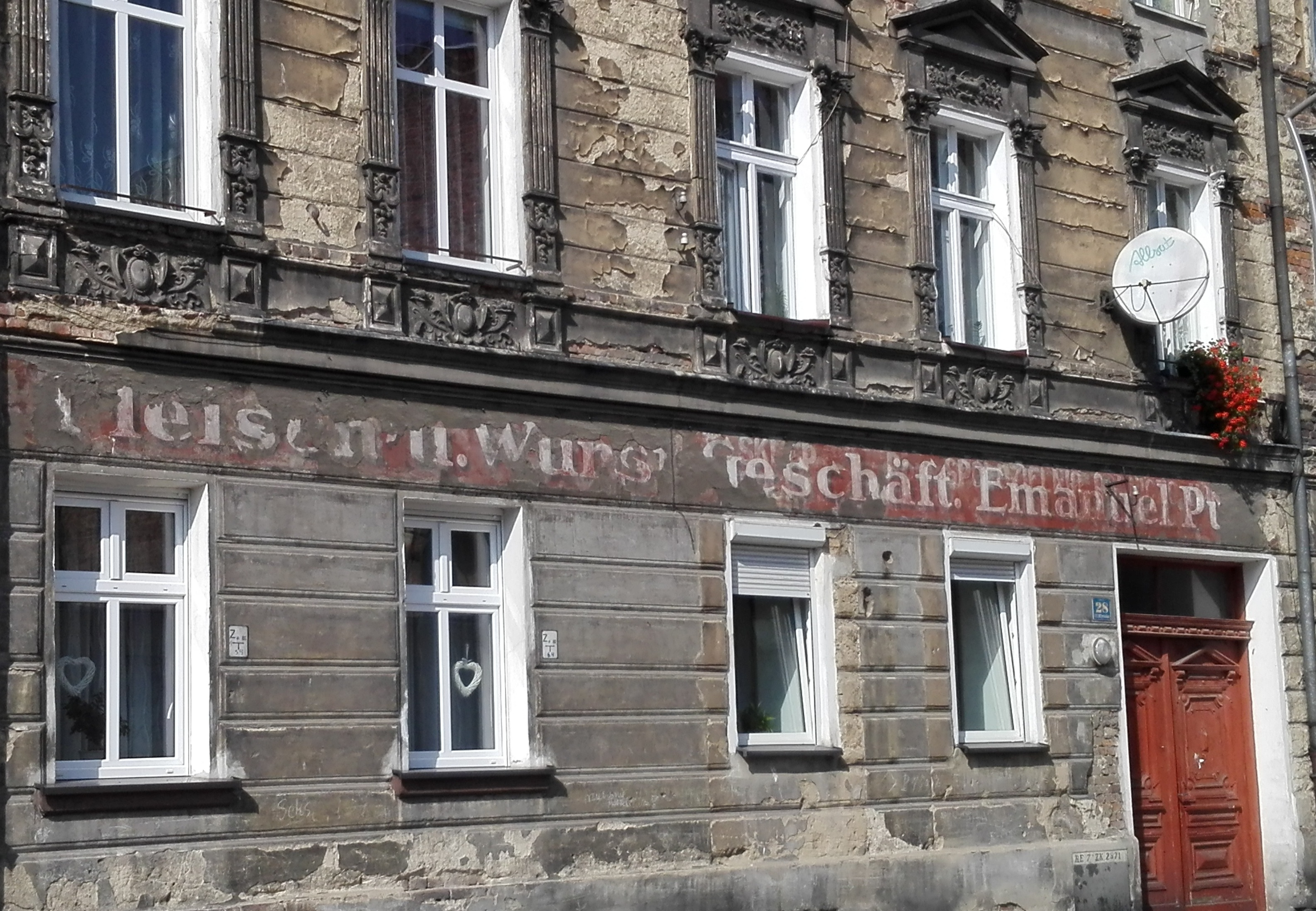
Remains of a German inscription on a tenement house at Młyńska Street

Historically, Prudnik was a predominantly German-speaking town, unlike nearby Biała, Głogówek and Strzeleczki, which were Polish. Following the end of the Second World War and post-1945 expulsions of the remaining pre-war population, Prudnik became predominantly Polish-speaking. New incomers were primarily resettled from areas in the east which Poland lost (Stanisławów and Tarnopol voivodeships), or from other provinces, notably the Lesser Poland region. German nationals, as well as Silesians, who stayed in the town were either resettled in the late 1940s and 1950s, or assimilated. A cultural society exists to promote German culture in the still-existing German minority.

In the National Population and Housing Census 2021, among the residents of Prudnik there were people who declared German, Silesian, Romani, English, Irish, Dutch, Ukrainian, Norwegian, Italian, American and Swedish nationalities. Furthermore, on the county level, the census noted Belarusians, Russians, Czechs, Armenians, Jews, Australians, Austrians, Moldovans, Slovaks, French, Canadians, Swiss, Tatars, Karaites, Lithuanians, Lemkos, Belgians, Japanese, Greeks, Spaniards, Kazakhs and Scots. Following the 2022 Russian invasion of Ukraine, the number of Ukrainians in Prudnik has increased to about 150, making them the second biggest minority group in Prudnik after Germans.

=== Historical population ===
Year	Population
1675	2,527
1754	2,905
1764	2,722
1774	3,048
1782	3,696
1829	4,000
1885	16,093
1890	17,577
1910	18,865
1939	17,339
1956	14,900

Year	Population
1962	14,900
1995	24 350
2000	23,800
2002	23,630
2003	23,528
2004	23,376
2005	23,234
2006	23,078
2007	22,927
2008	22,787
2009	22,663

Year	Population
2010	22,514
2011	22,164
2012	21,979
2013	21,778
2014	21,676
2015	21,472
2016	21,368

=== Religion ===
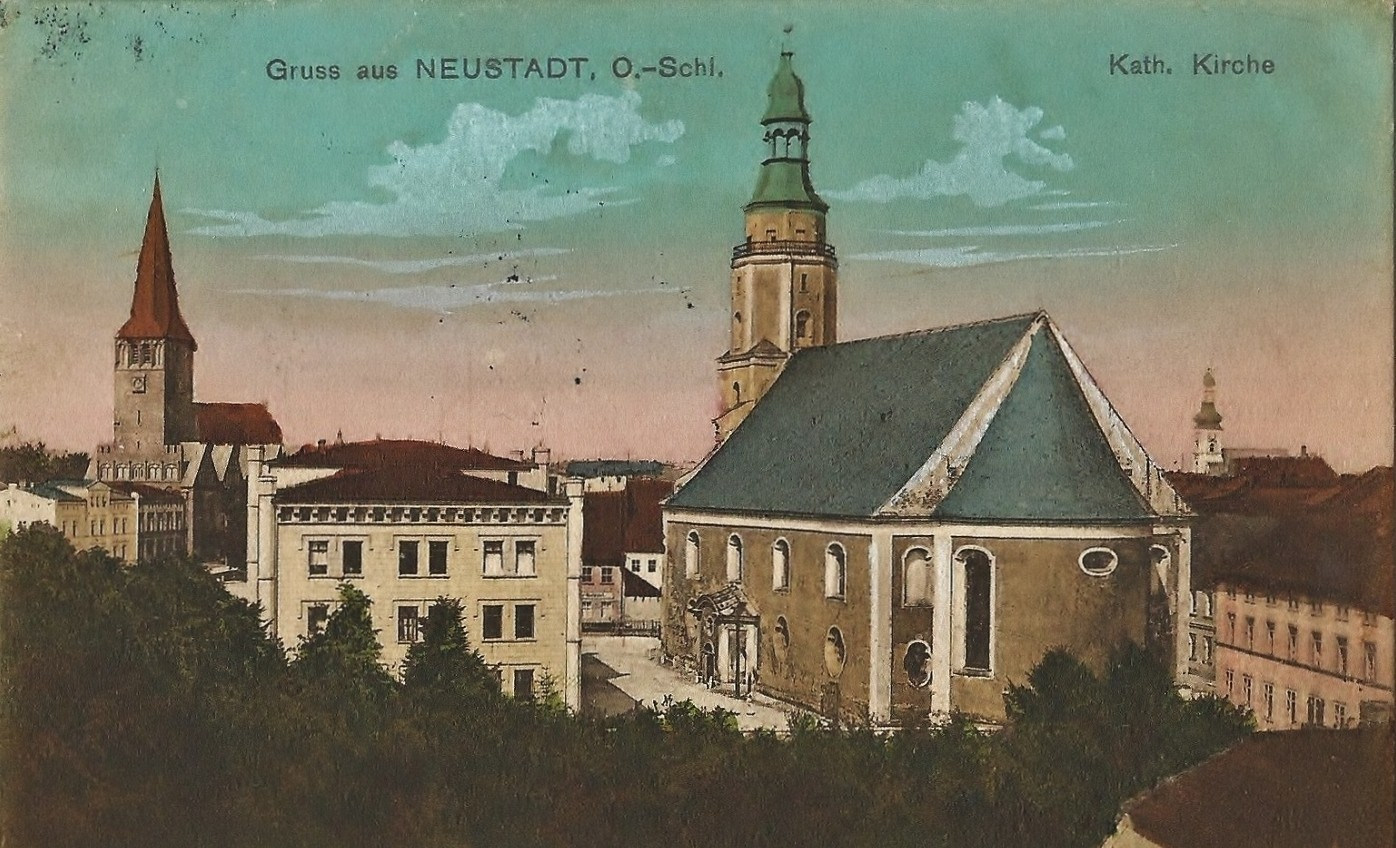
Evangelical church and two Catholic churches of Prudnik depicted on a historical postcard

Prudnik's population is predominantly Roman Catholic, like the rest of Poland. Historically, the town was inhabited by Catholics, Protestants and Jews. As of 2022, among the residents of Prudnik there were Catholics, Pentecostals, Jehovah's Witnesses, as well as individual followers of Judaism and Protestantism.

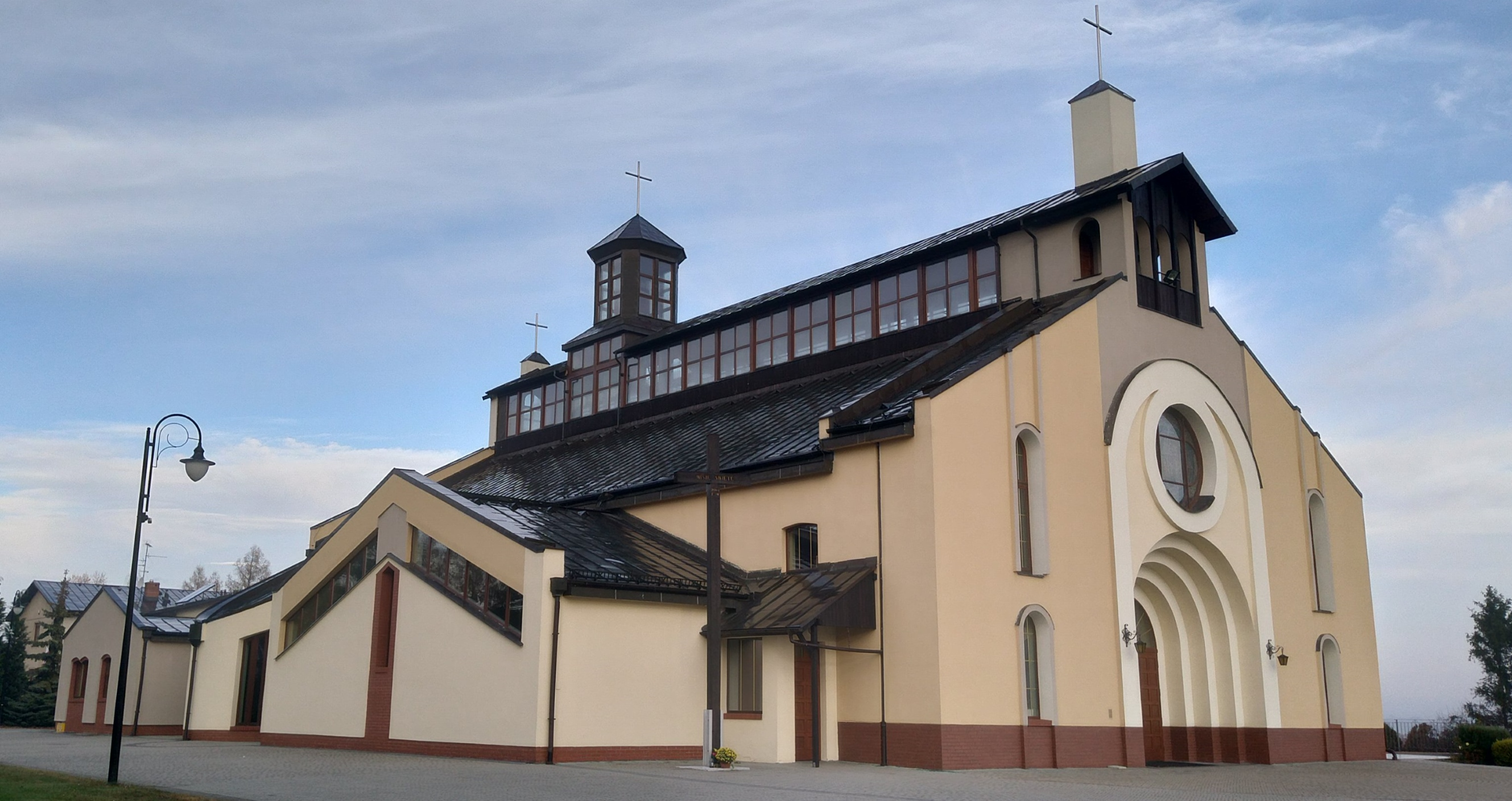
Divine Mercy Church

Prudnik is a seat of a local Catholic decanate. The town houses two Catholic parishes, which are dedicated to St. Michael and to Divine Mercy. There are four Catholic churches in Prudnik: St. Michael's, Saints Peter and Paul, St. Joseph and Divine Mercy. The ruins of nearby Nativity of the Virgin Mary Sanctuary were demolished after World War II. Since 2021, Stefan Wyszyński is the town's patron saint.

The town lost most of its Protestant population following the post-1945 expulsions of Germans. The Evangelical parish of Prudnik was shut down in the 1960s, and the local Evangelical church was demolished. Since 1990, a congregation of the Pentecostal Church in Poland operates in the town. In 2025, an Evangelical Church of God was established in Prudnik.

The town had a significant Jewish population. The Jewish community of Prudnik did not recover after the Second World War and the Holocaust. The town commemorates its Jewish heritage by naming locations after its notable Jewish residents.

A Kingdom Hall of Jehovah's Witnesses is located at Piastowska Street. The town also has a Raëlian community.

== Education ==
Prudnik houses seven kindergartens, four primary schools, four high schools (including two for adults), three technikums, four vocational school, a music school and four tertiary schools.

Gmina Prudnik governs three school complexes, which consist of kindergartens and primary schools. Under the governance of the Prudnik County are the Adam Mickiewicz and Stefania Sempołowska high schools, the Centre for Vocational and Continuing Education (Centrum Kształcenia Zawodowego i Ustawicznego), the District Centre for Practical Education (Powiatowe Centrum Kształcenia Praktycznego) and the agricultural school (Zespół Szkół Rolniczych). The local government of the Opole Voivodeship governs the medical school (Zespół Szkół Medycznych) in Prudnik.

Education institutions in Prudnik

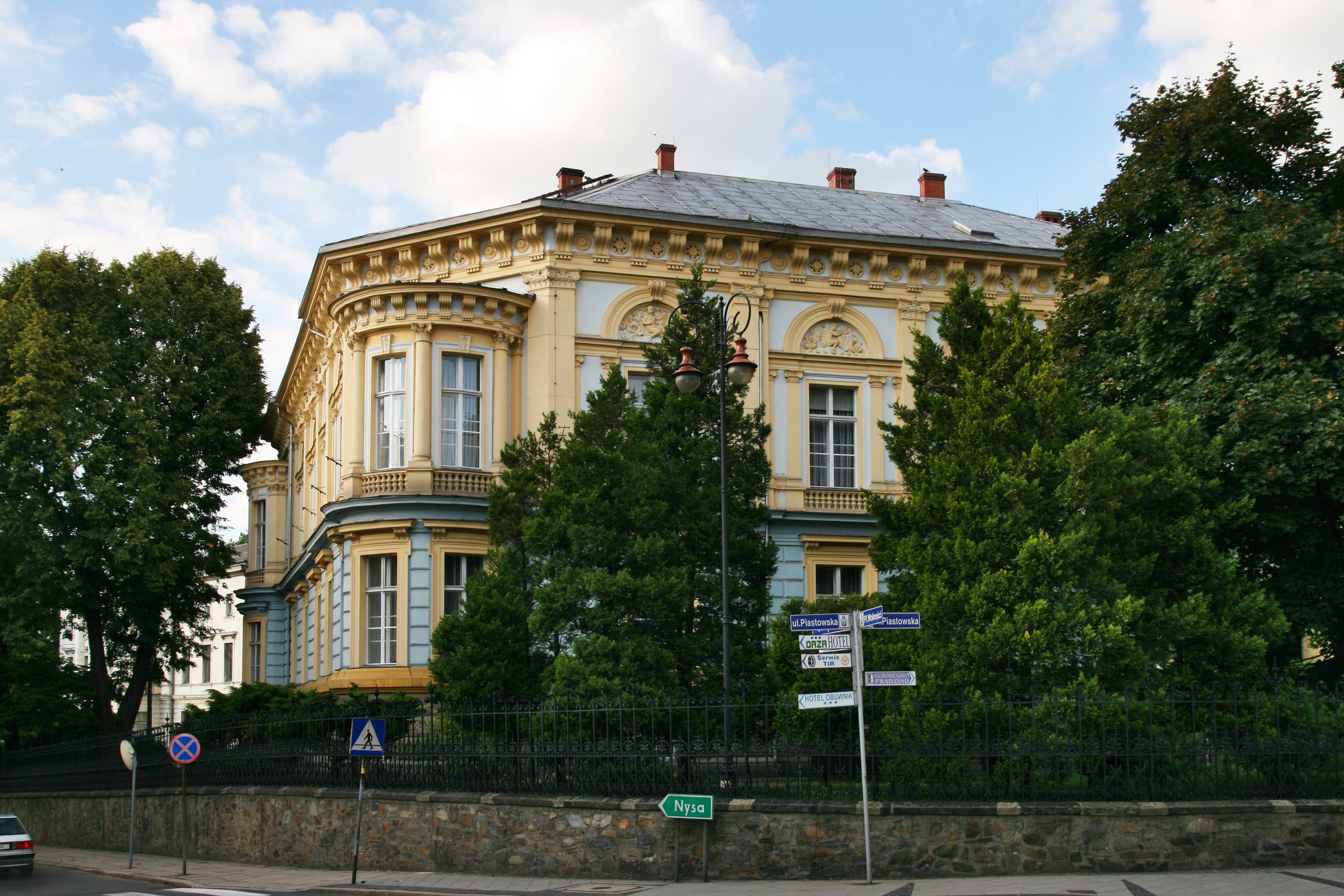
Medical school

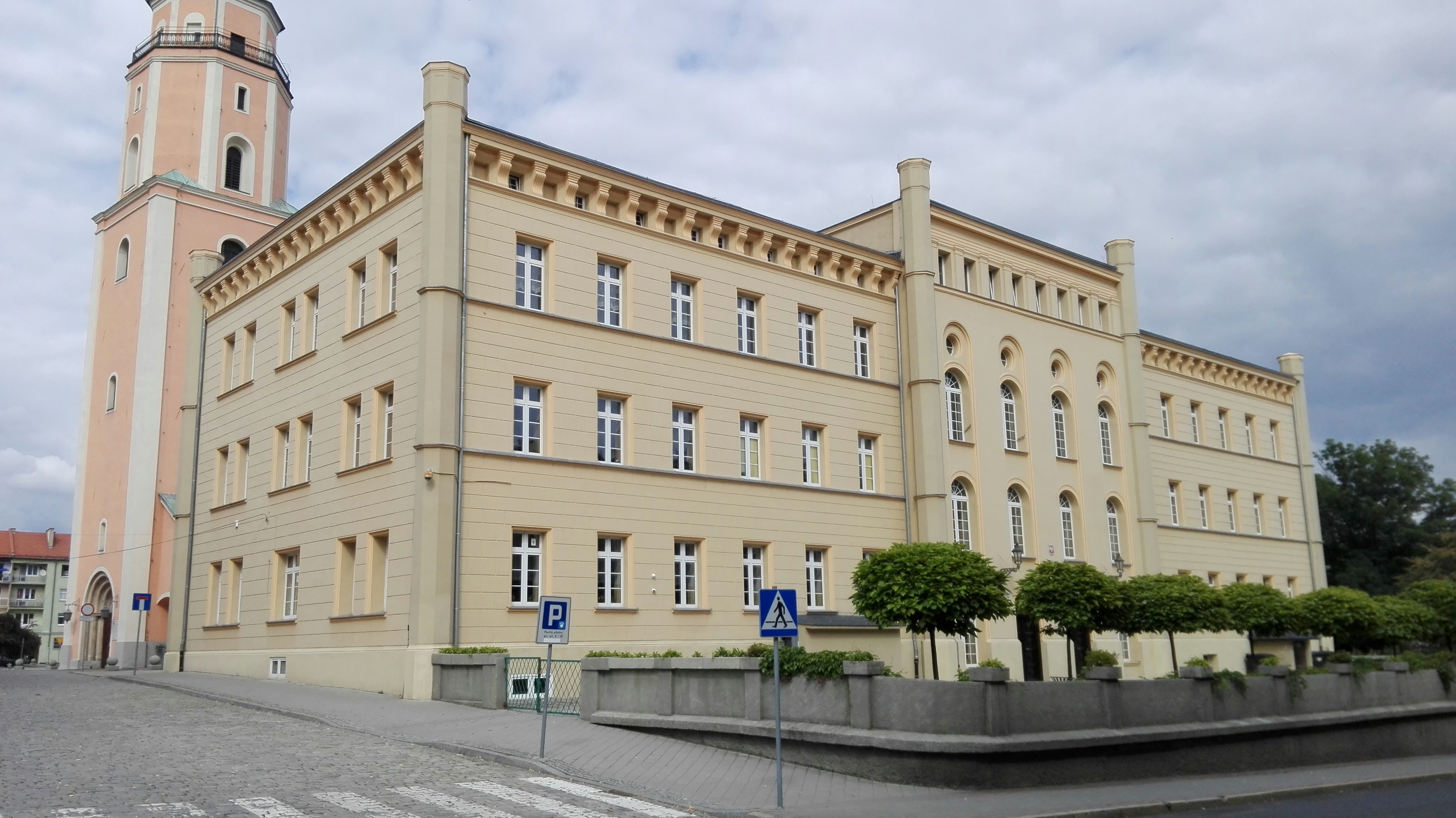
Primary School no. 1

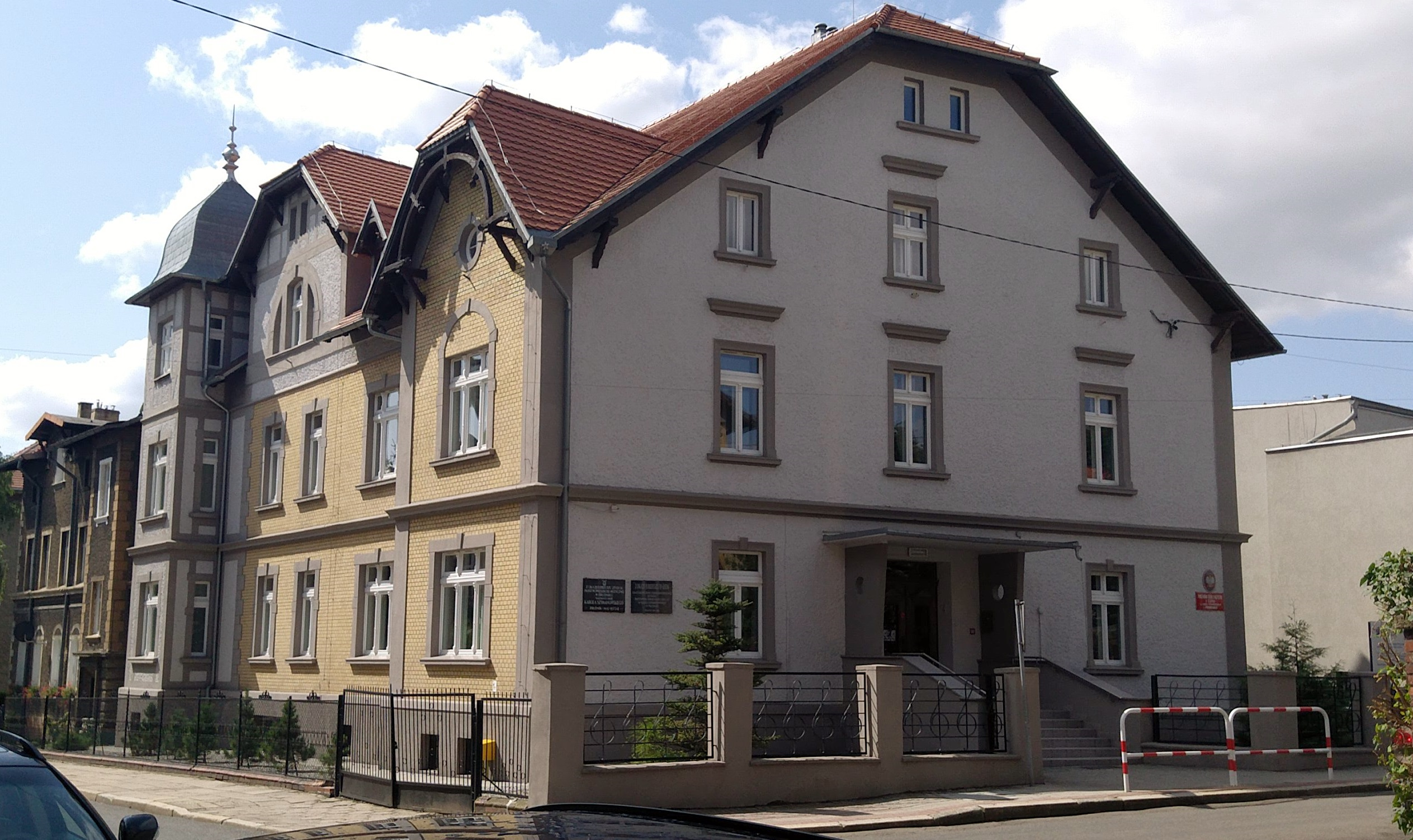
Music school

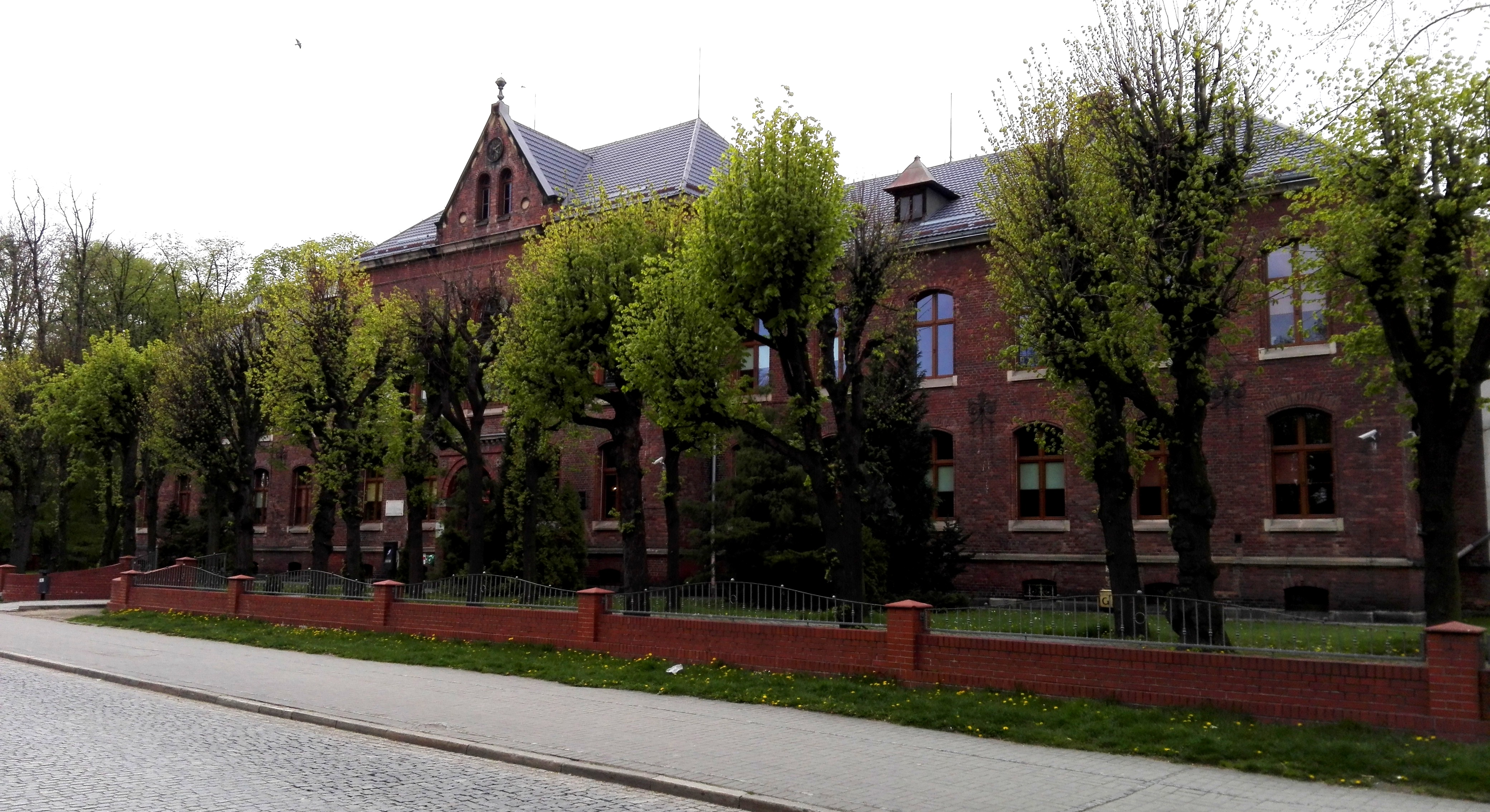
Adam Mickiewicz High School

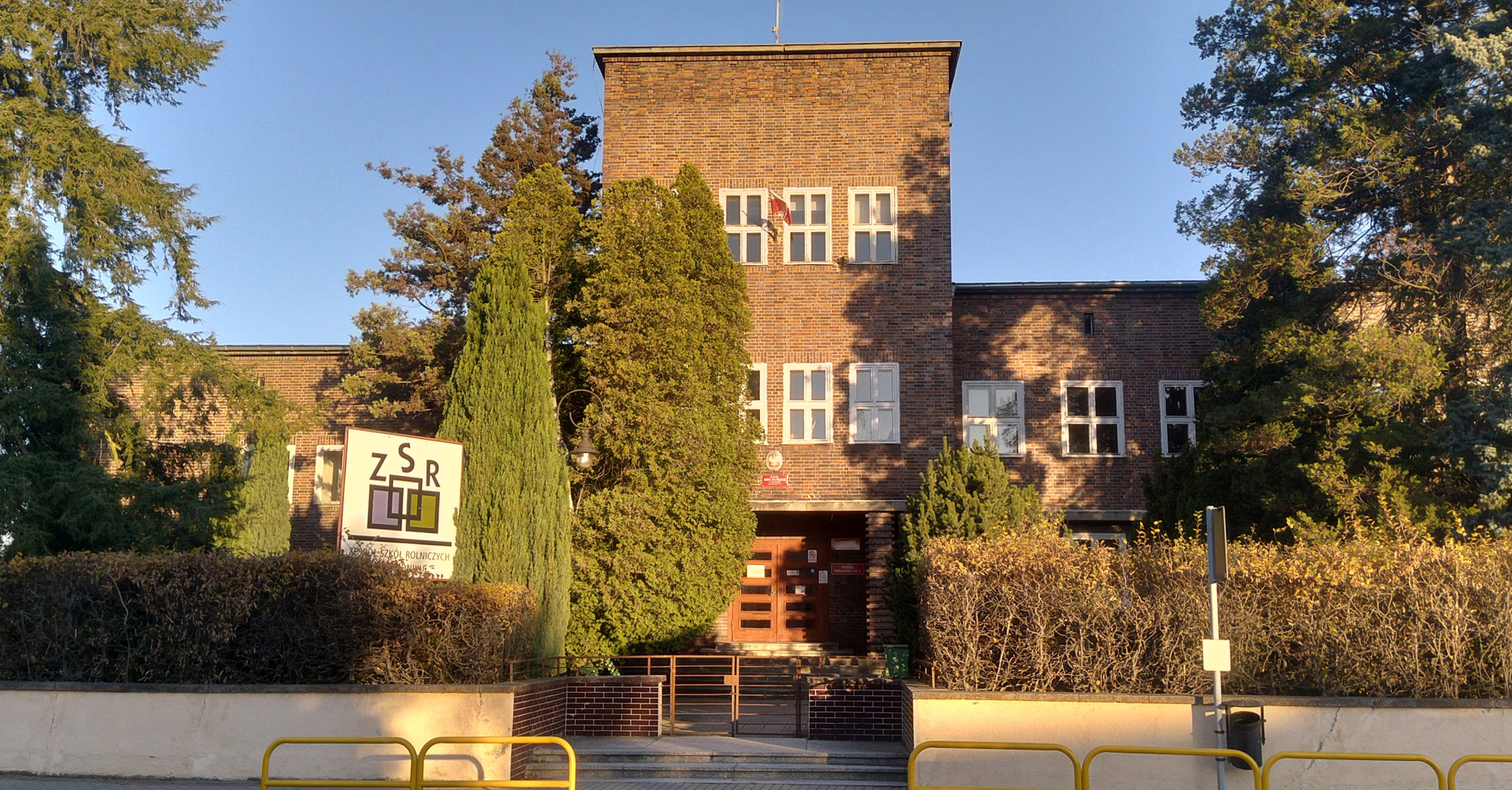
Agricultural school

== Sights ==
Prudnik is a town rich in historic architecture from various periods. Among its sights are:

- medieval Wok's Tower (Wieża Woka), a remnant of the castle
- preserved parts of the medieval town walls with the Lower Gate (Brama Dolna) and the Katowska and Mała towers which are part of the local historical museum (Muzeum Ziemi Prudnickiej)
- Baroque-Classicist Prudnik Town Hall
- Baroque St. Michael's Church
- Baroque Saints Peter and Paul Church
- Park Miejski ("Town Park") with the Diana statue, a monument to local Polish activists fallen in the Silesian Uprisings and murdered in Nazi concentration camps, a monument commemorating the 1000th anniversary of the founding of the Polish State, etc.
- Prudnik Culture Centre (Prudnicki Ośrodek Kultury)
- public Town Bath (Łaźnia Miejska)
- St. Joseph Church
- World War II memorials, including a memorial to Polish children and youth, heroes and victims of the war at the Plac Szarych Szeregów ("Gray Ranks Square"), a monument to Polish soldiers fighting on various war fronts for Poland's freedom at the Plac Wolności ("Freedom Square"), and two mass graves of prisoners of the Nazi German Auschwitz concentration camp, murdered in the town in 1945
- Baroque Marian column and Saint John of Nepomuk statue
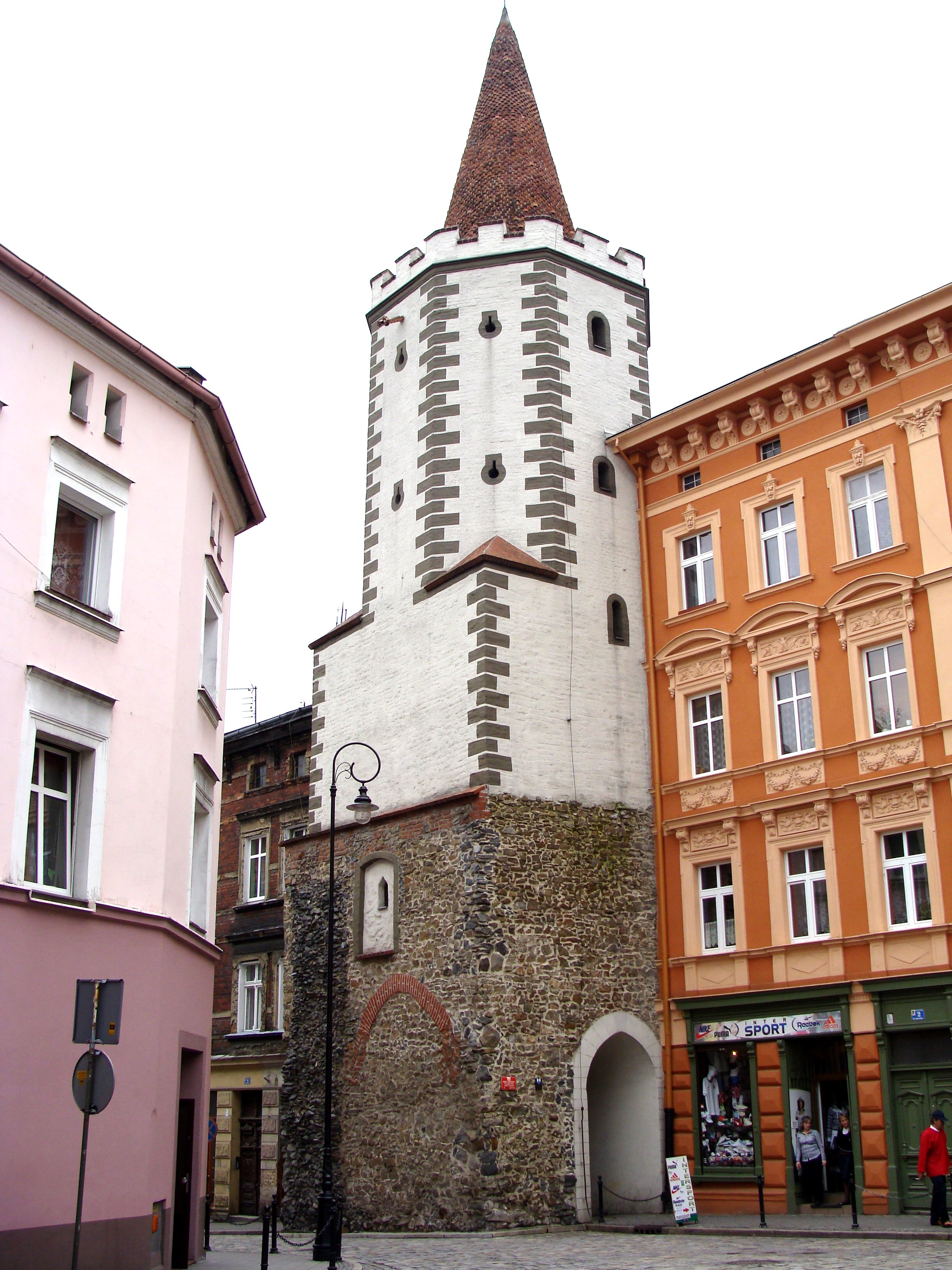
Lower Gate

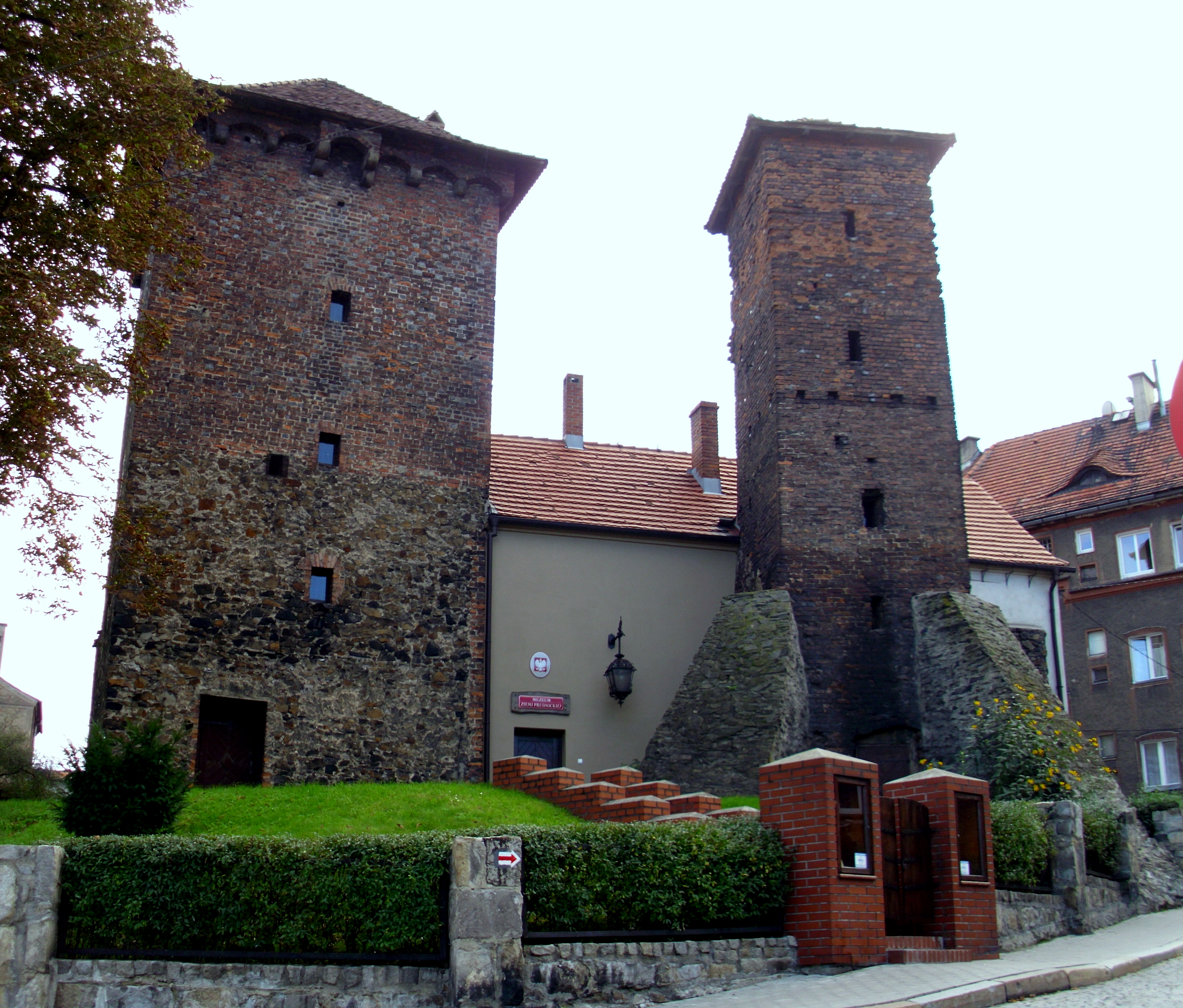
Historical museum

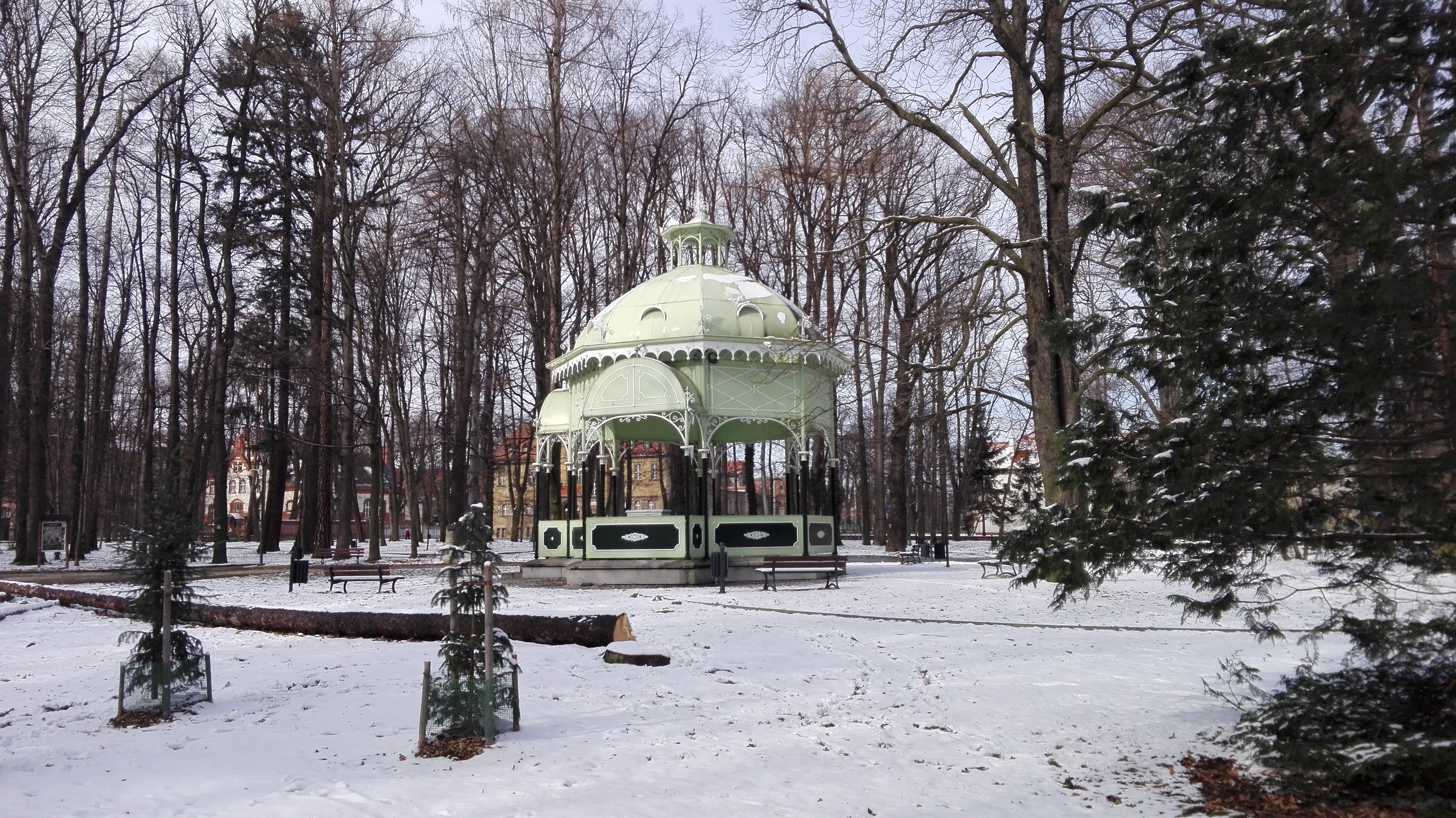
Park Miejski in winter

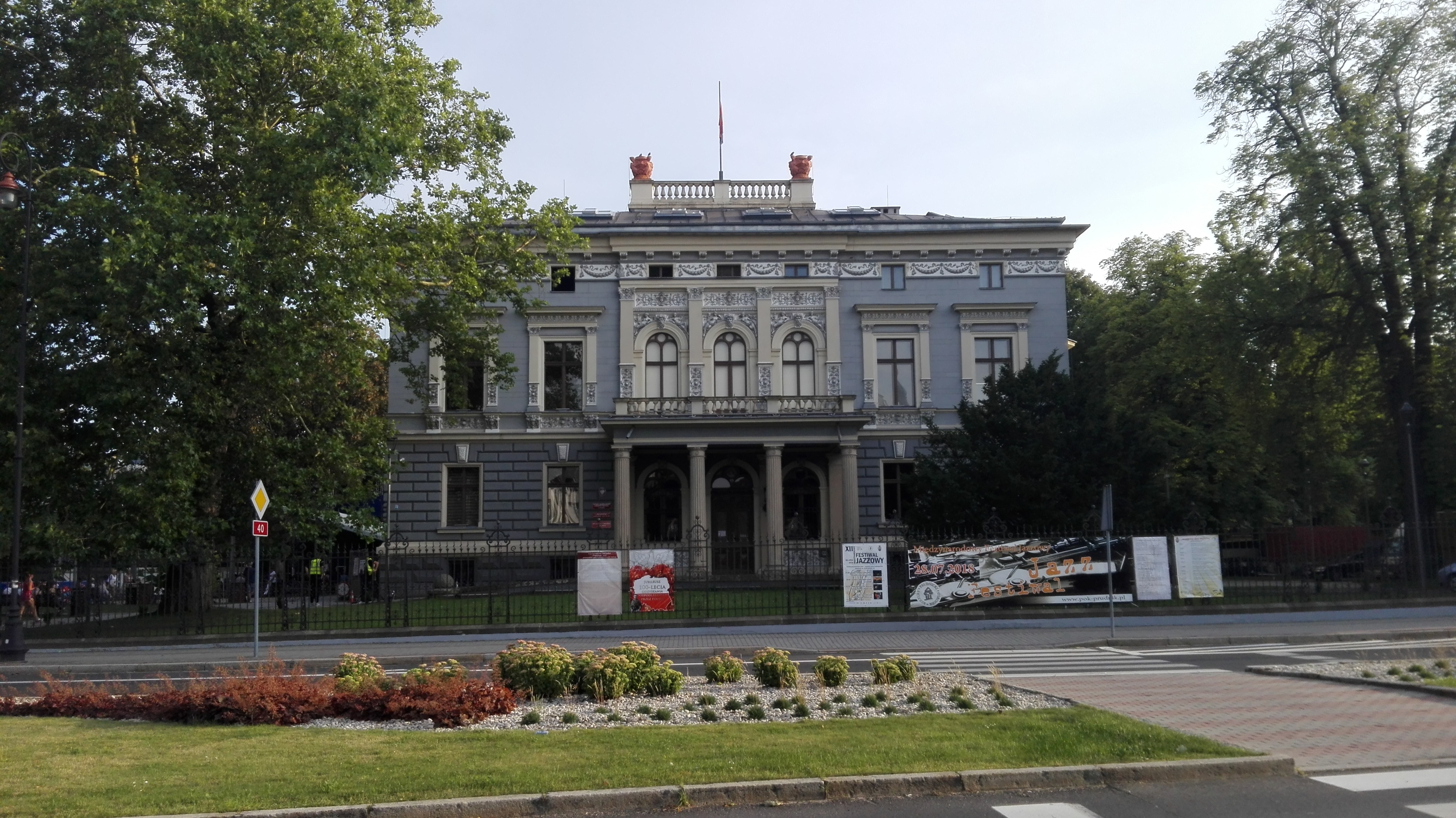
Prudnik Culture Centre

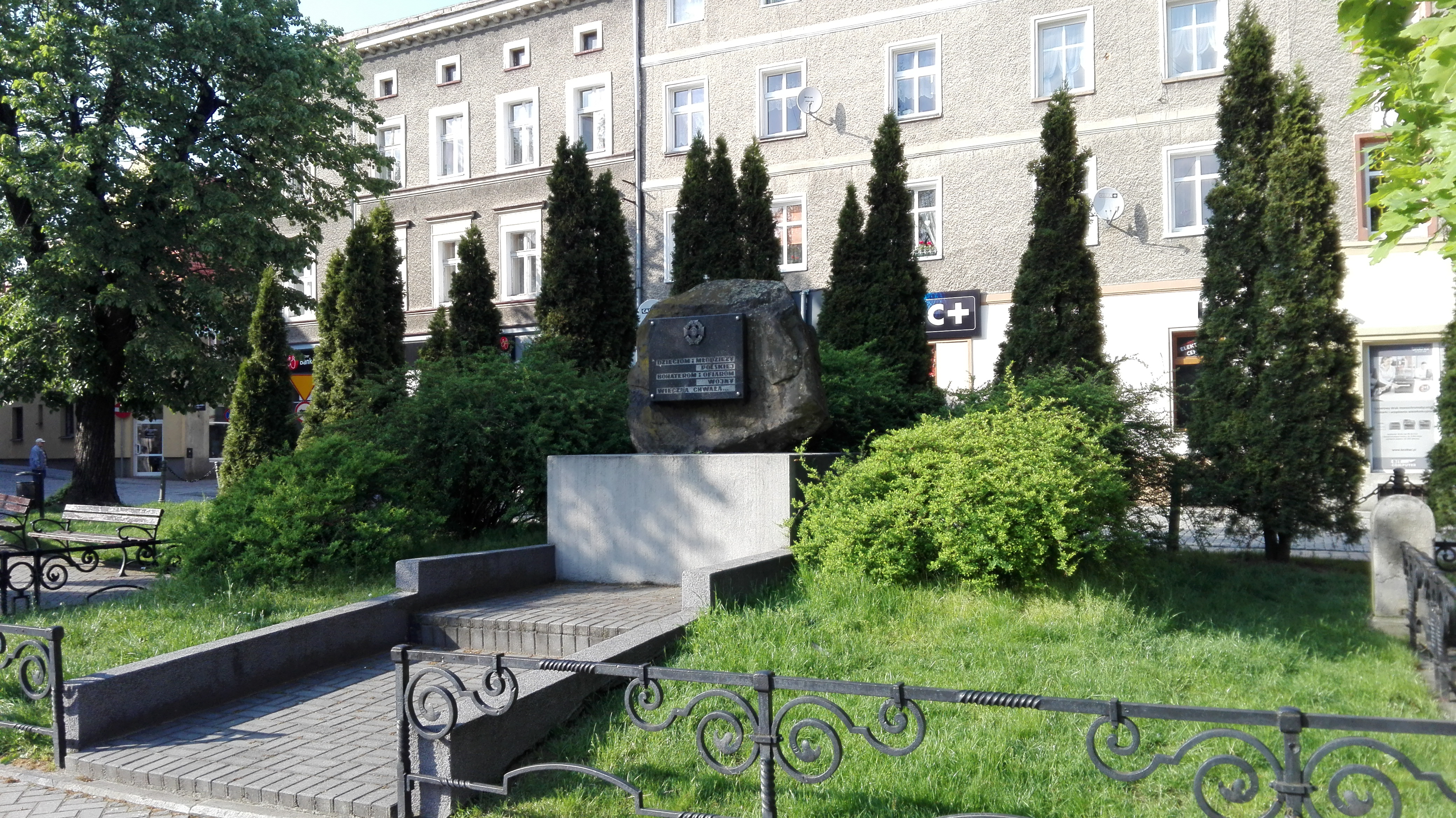
Memorial to Polish children and youth, heroes and victims of World War II

== Sport ==
=== Sports venues ===
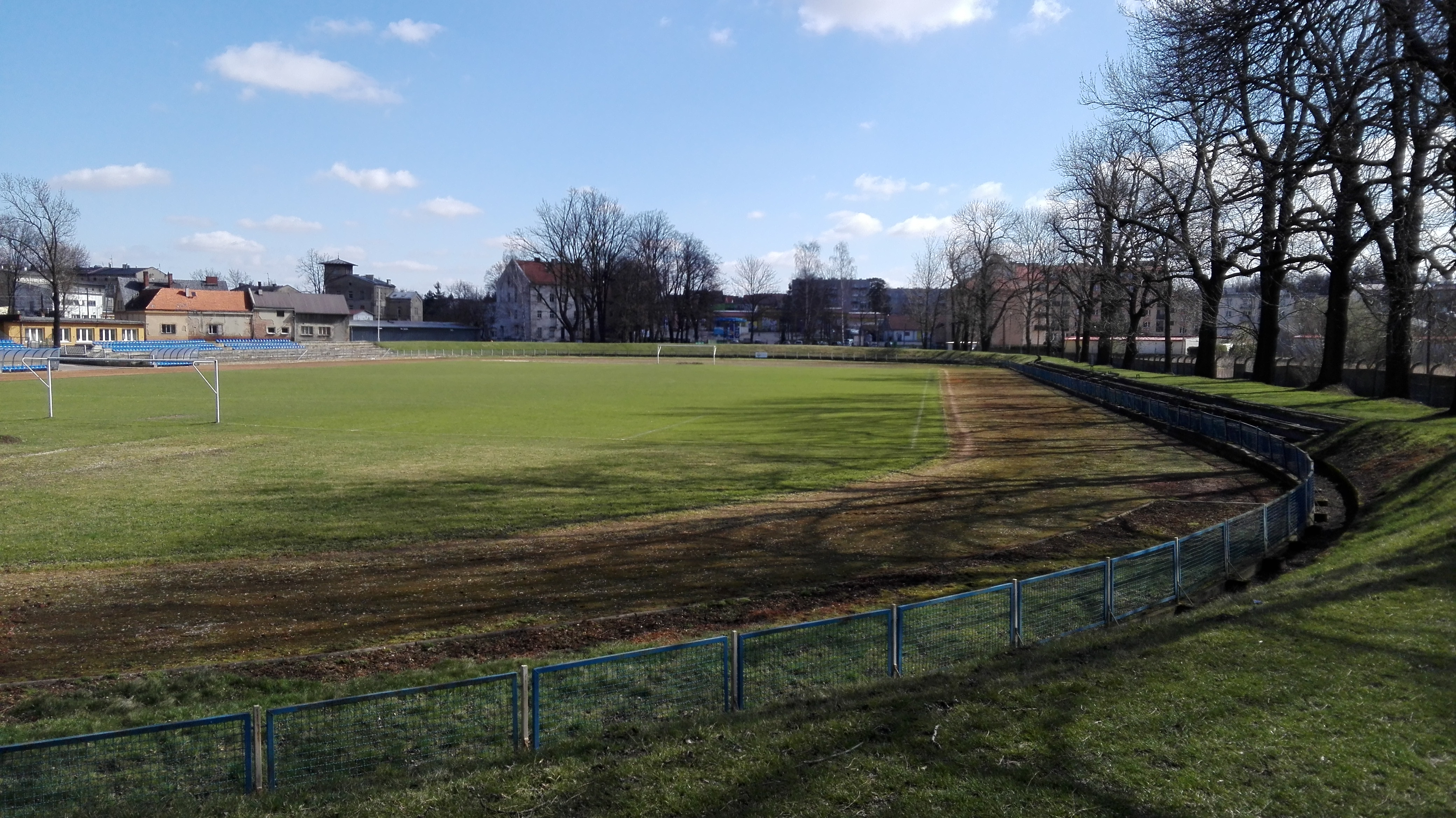
Municipal Stadium

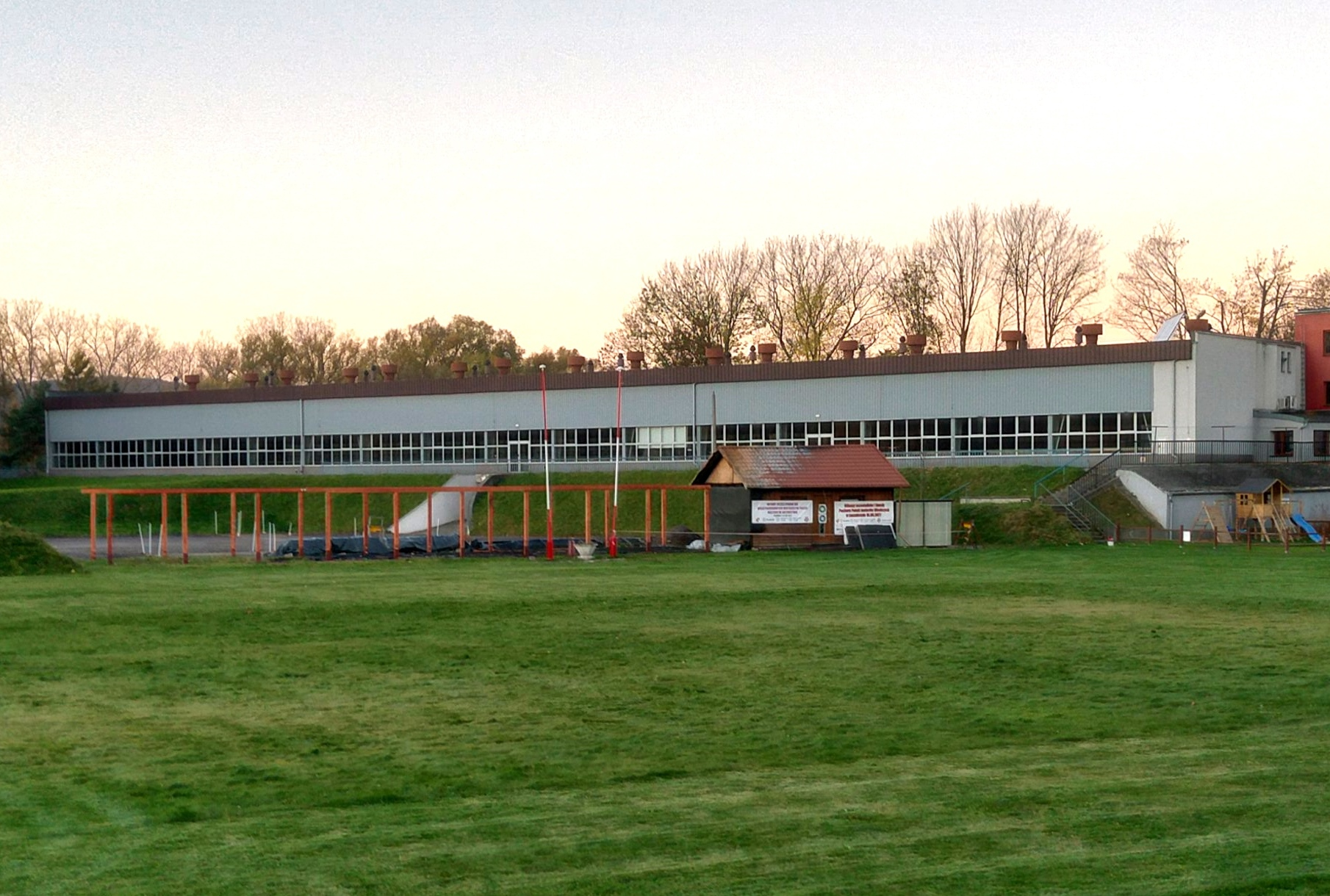
"Obuwnik" sports hall

- Municipal Stadium, 7 Kolejowa Street
- Stadium, 10 Włoska Street
- "Obuwnik" sports hall, 1 Łucznicza Street
- archery course, 1 Łucznicza Street
- Sports Complex named after the Traditions of Pogoń Lwów and Polonia Bytom
  - Orlik 2012 field
  - natural turf football pitch
  - basketball court
  - running track
  - a place for parkour
- "Sójka" Sports Complex
  - indoor swimming pool
  - sports hall
  - tennis court
  - multifunctional sports fields
  - street workout park
  - running track
- Orlik 2012 field in the Town Park
- tennis courts in the Town Park
- swimming pool, 1 Zwycięstwa Street

=== Sports teams ===
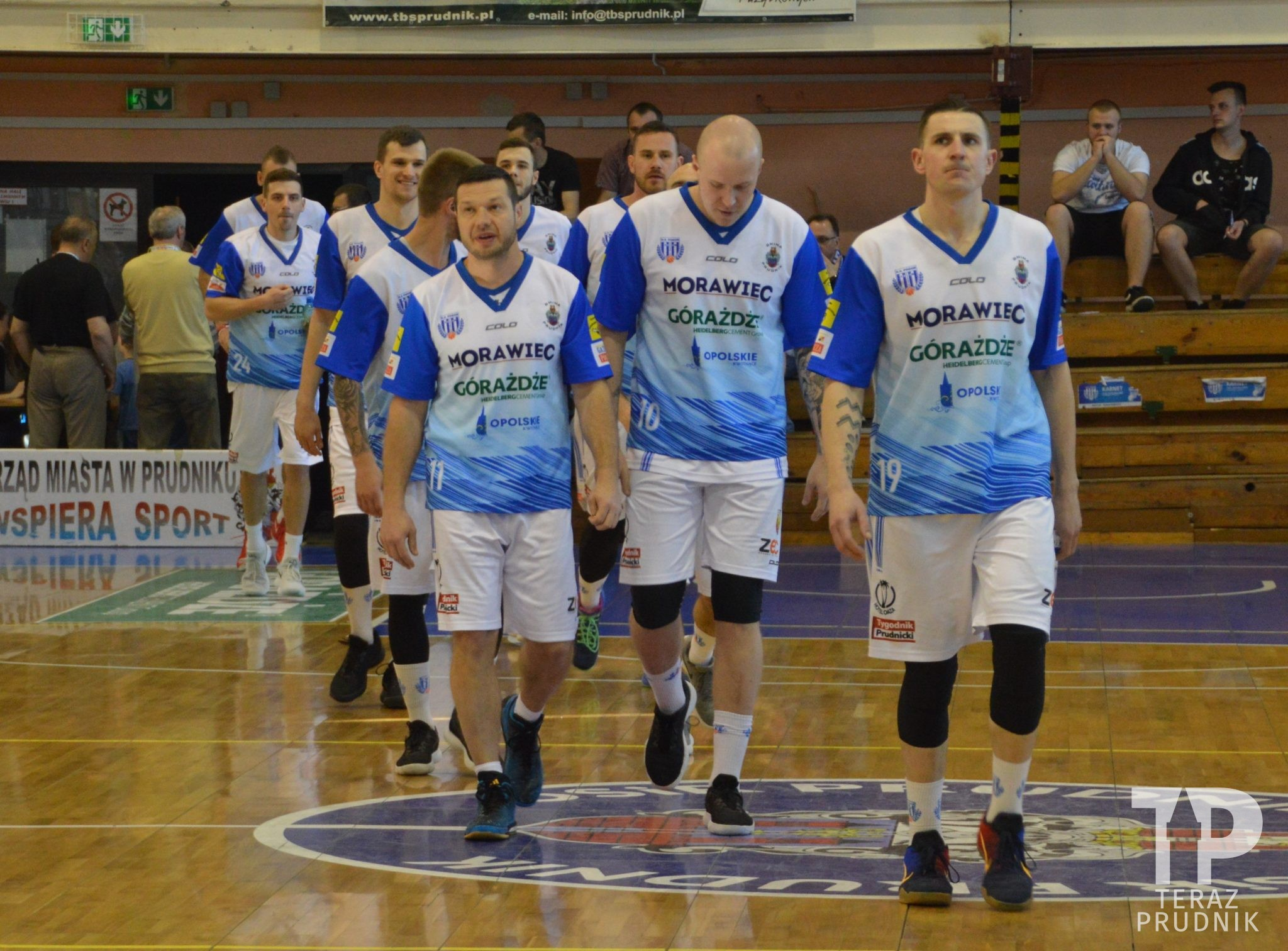
Pogoń Prudnik basketball team

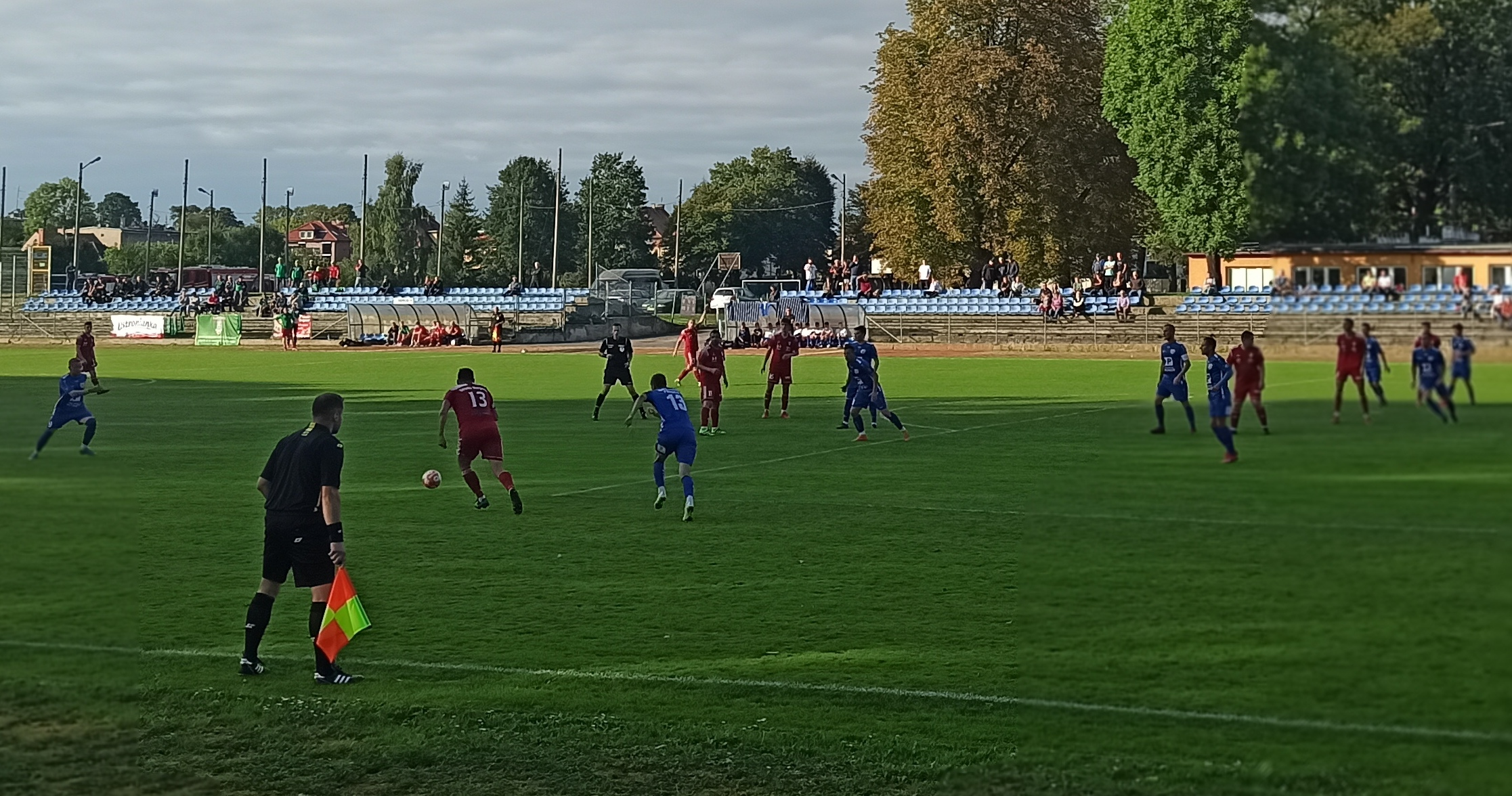
Football Pogoń Prudnik playing against Odrzanka Dziergowice

- KS Pogoń Prudnik, men's basketball team, formerly of the Polish national 1st basketball league. The most notable basketball team of Opole Voivodeship.
- MKS Pogoń Prudnik, men's football team, formerly of II liga.
- KS Obuwnik Prudnik, archery team, three-time Polish Champion.
- SPS Prudnik, volleyball team, formerly of III liga.
- LKS Zarzewie Prudnik, karate and chess club, notable for its former cycling section.
- LKJ Olimp Prudnik, horse riding team.
- MKS Sparta Prudnik, football team.
- Stowarzyszenie Sportowe "Tigers" Prudnik, football, parkour, freerun club.
- MKS Smyk Prudnik, basketball team.
- UKS Czwórka Prudnik, floorball and roller skating club.
- UKS Orlik Prudnik, football team.
- LZS Dębowiec-Prudnik, football team.
- Saints United Kings Prudnik, jujutsu team.
- KP Sójka Prudnik, swimming team.
- UKS Freestyle Prudnik, cycling team.
- MUKS Pogoń Prudnik, women's football, table tennis, chess, boxing team.

Other sports clubs which operated in Prudnik include football teams WKS Kabewiak Prudnik and LUKS Flora Prudnik, cycling clubs LZS Prudnik, Włókniarz Prudnik, Pogoń Prudnik, Zryw Prudnik, PTTK Prudnik, Góral Ziemia Prudnicka, SKS Prudnik, as well as the ice hockey team Pogoń Prudnik. Prior to the Second World War, four football clubs operated in Prudnik: SV Guts Muths Neustadt, VfR Neustadt, SC Preußen Neustadt, DJK Neustadt.

Prudnik is home to the only men's Basketball Youth Sports Training Center of the Polish Basketball Federation in Opole Voivodeship.

== Notable people ==
=== Born in Prudnik ===
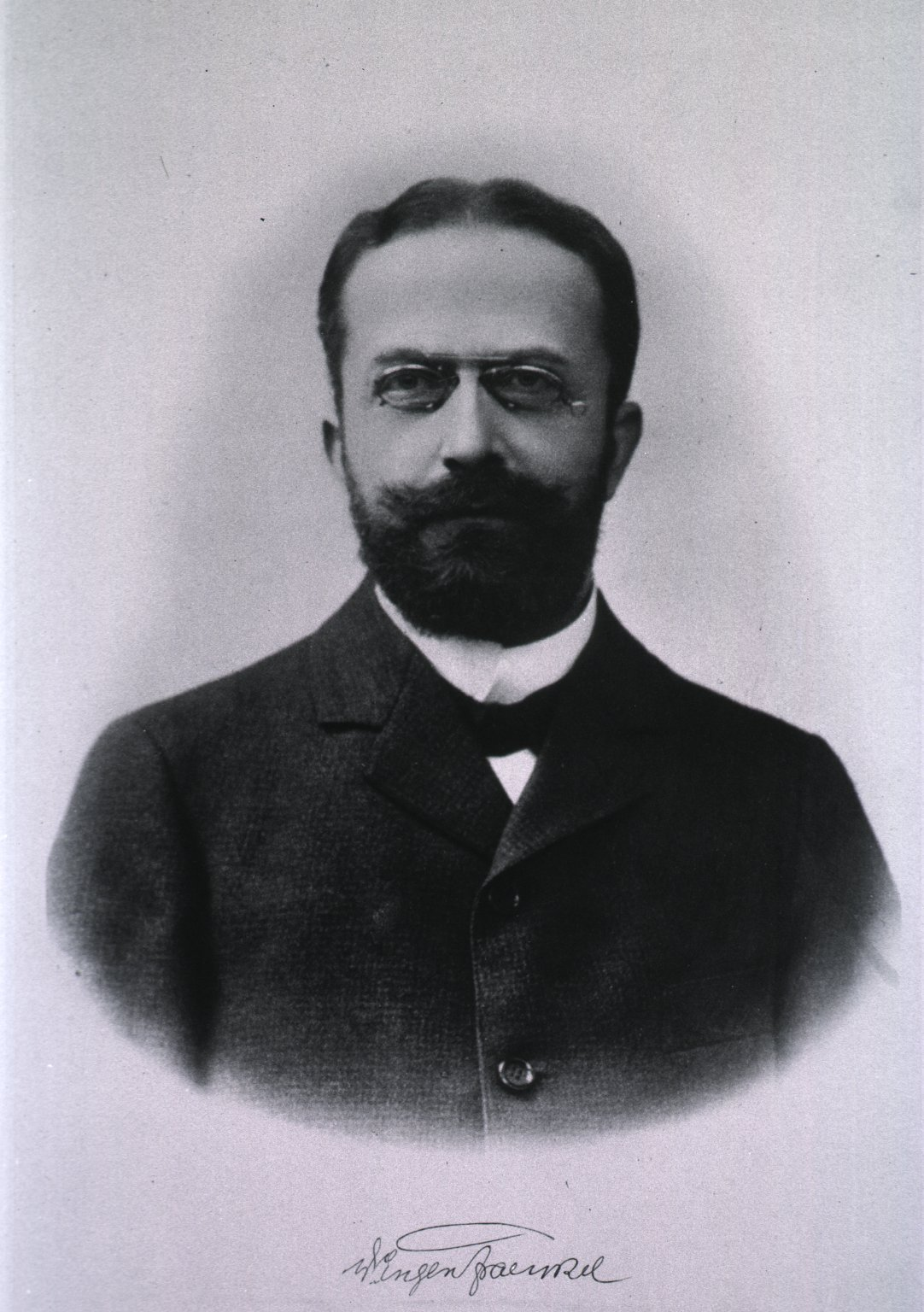
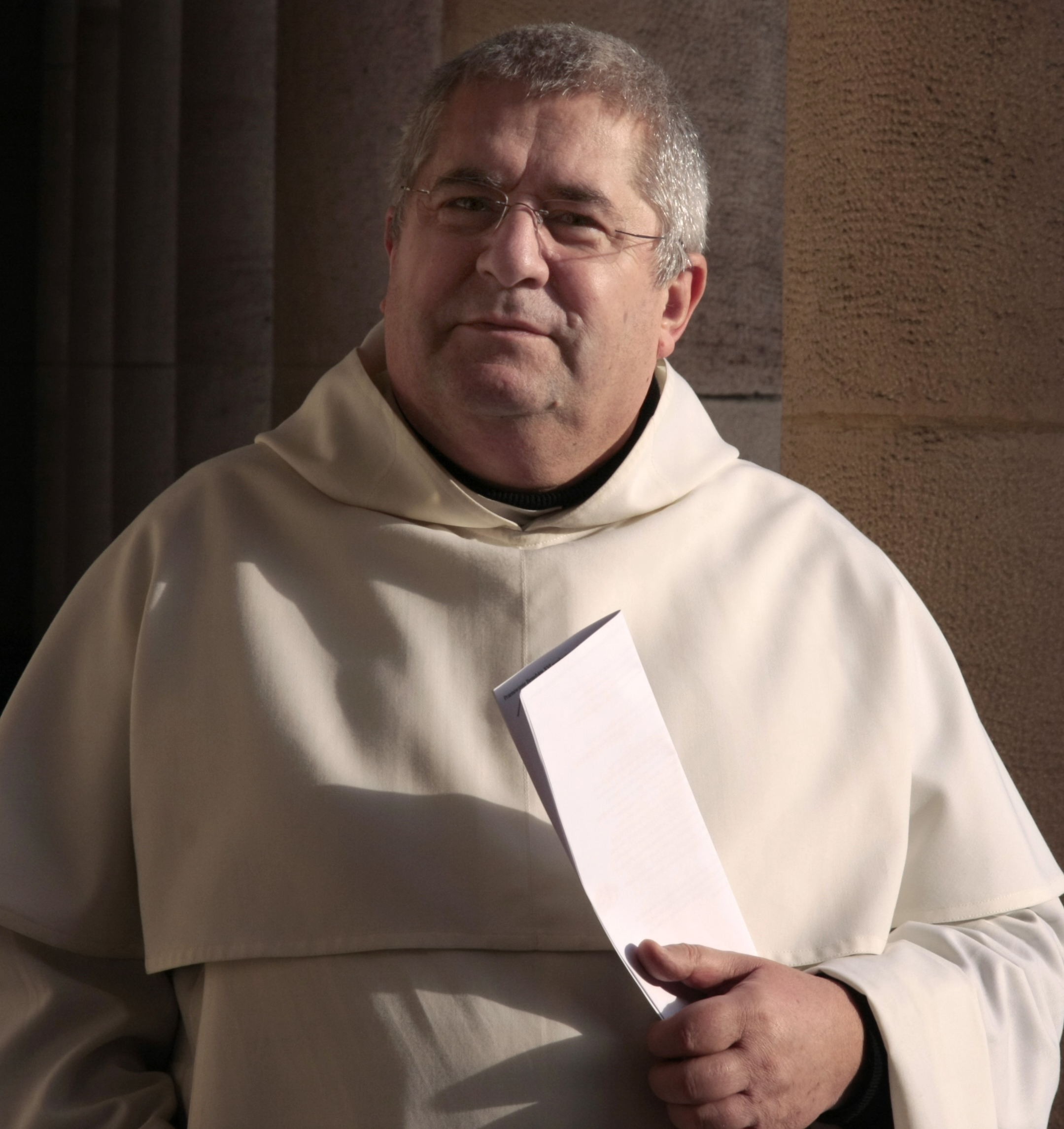
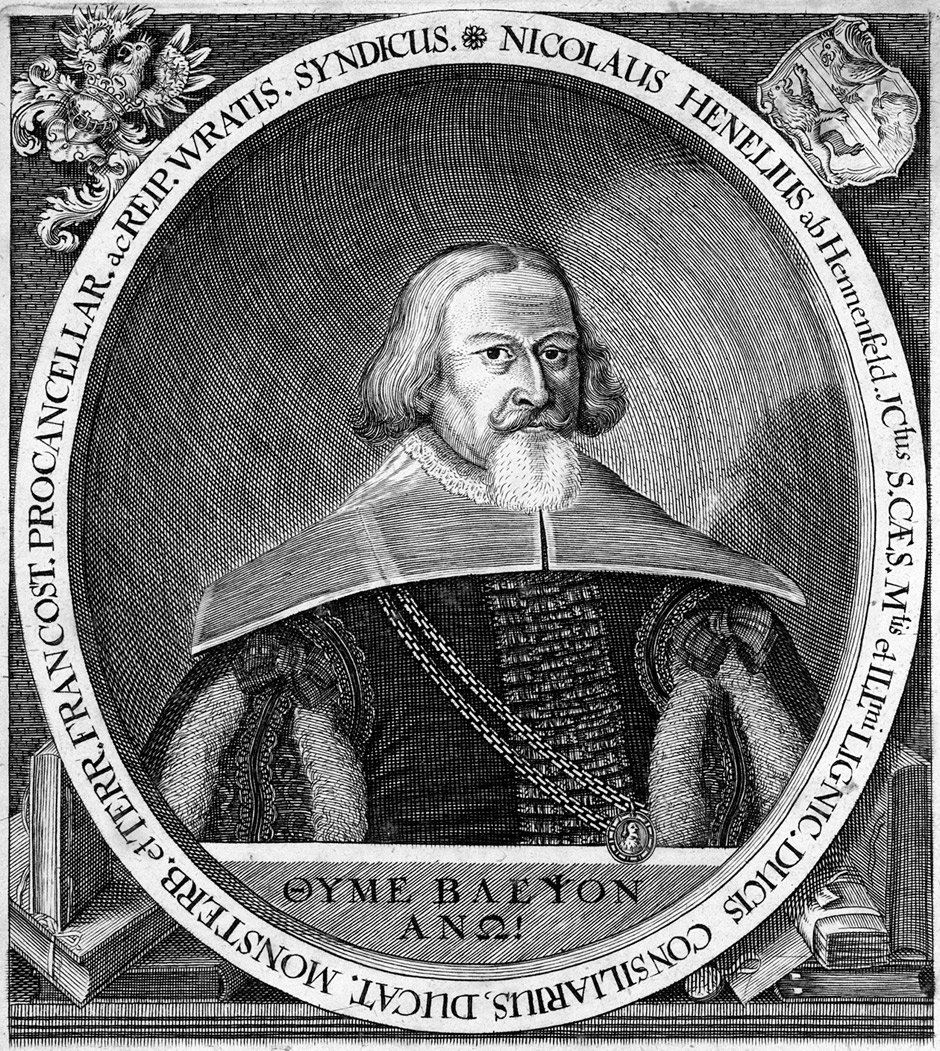
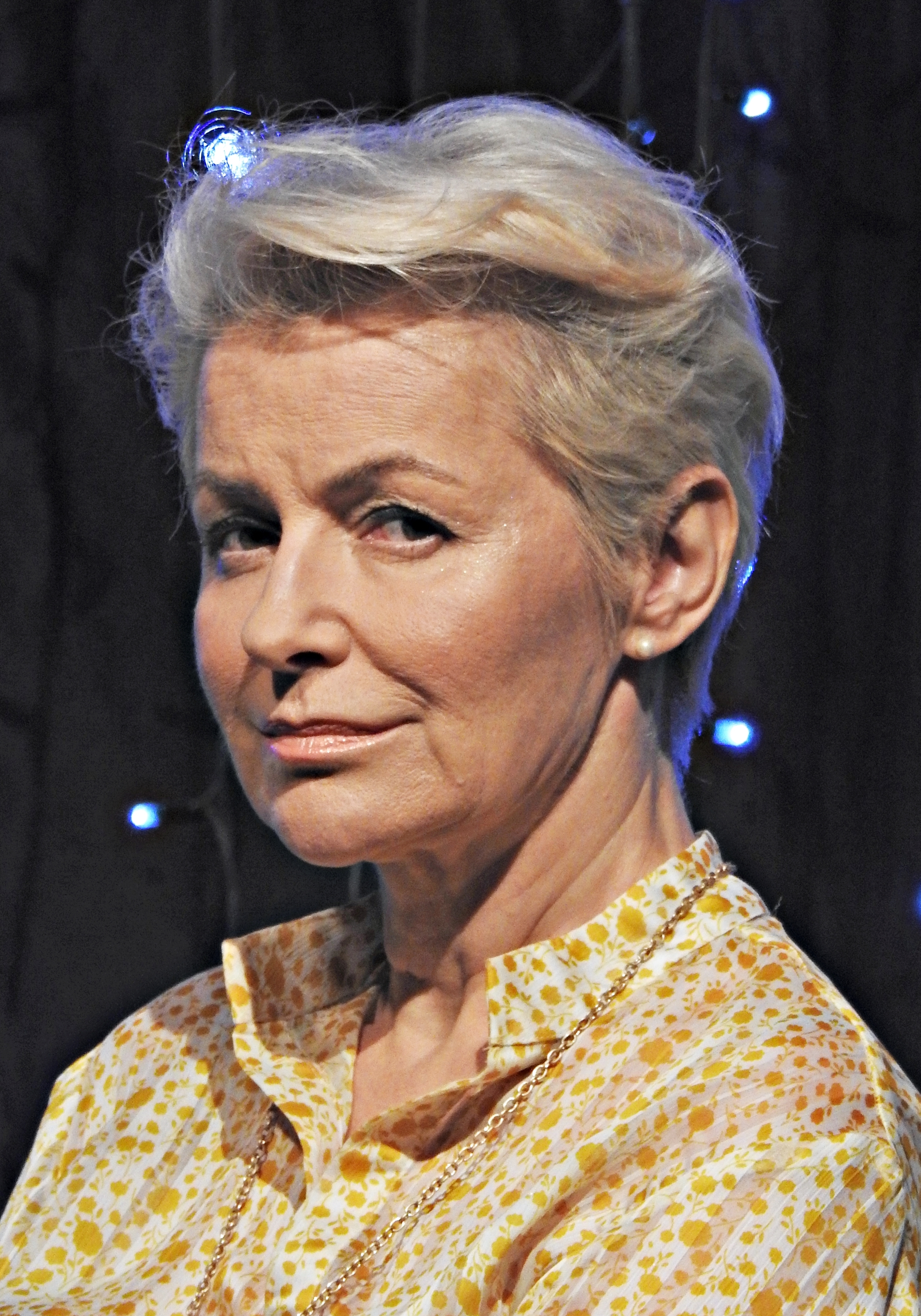
Notable people born in Prudnik, clockwise from upper left: Eugen Fraenkel, Jan Góra, Aleksandra Konieczna, Nicholas Henel
- Matthäus Apelles von Löwenstern (1594–1648), German psalmist.
- Felice Bauer (1887–1960), fiancée of Franz Kafka.
- Michał "Z.B.U.K.U" Buczek (born 1992), Polish rapper.
- Karl Franz Otto Dziatzko (1842–1903), German librarian.
- Eugen Fraenkel (1853–1925), German bacteriologist.
- Wilhelm Siegmund Frei (1885–1943), German dermatologist.
- Otto von Garnier (1858–1947), German general.
- Jan Góra (1948–2015), Polish Dominican.
- Ludwig Hardt (1886–1947), German actor.
- Karl Heinisch (1847–1923), German painter.
- Joanna Helbin (born 1960), Polish archer.
- Nicholas Henel (1582–1656), Silesian historian.
- Hans Hoffmann (1902–1949), German lyrical tenor and musicologist.
- Grzegorz Kaliciak (born 1973), Polish general.
- Maria Koc (born 1964), Polish politician.
- Aleksandra Konieczna (born 1965), Polish actress.
- Tadeusz Madziarczyk (born 1961), Polish politician.
- Margarete Müller (1931–2024), German politician.
- Bogusław Pawłowski (born 1962), Polish anthropologist.
- Peter Peschel (born 1972), German footballer.
- Max Pinkus (1857–1934), German industrialist.
- Ewa Plonka (born 1982), Polish operatic soprano.
- Tomasz "Szamot" Pusz (born 1997), Polish musician.
- Hellmuth Reymann (1892–1988), German general, commander of the Berlin Defence Area.
- Bernd Scholz (1911–1969), German composer.
- Karl Streibel (1903–1986), German SS officer, commander of Trawniki.
- Krzysztof Szafrański (born 1972), Polish cyclist.
- Shmuel of Karov (1735–1820), Polish Hasidic rebbe.
- Adam Świerkocz (born 1964), Polish general.
- Dietrich Unkrodt (1934–2006), German musician.
- Jarosław Wasik (born 1971), Polish singer-songwriter.
- Hans Weidel (1903–1985), German lawyer, Nazi activist.
- Kurt Wintgens (1894–1916), German fighter ace.
- Józef Wojaczek (1901–1993), Polish Catholic priest.

=== Other residents ===
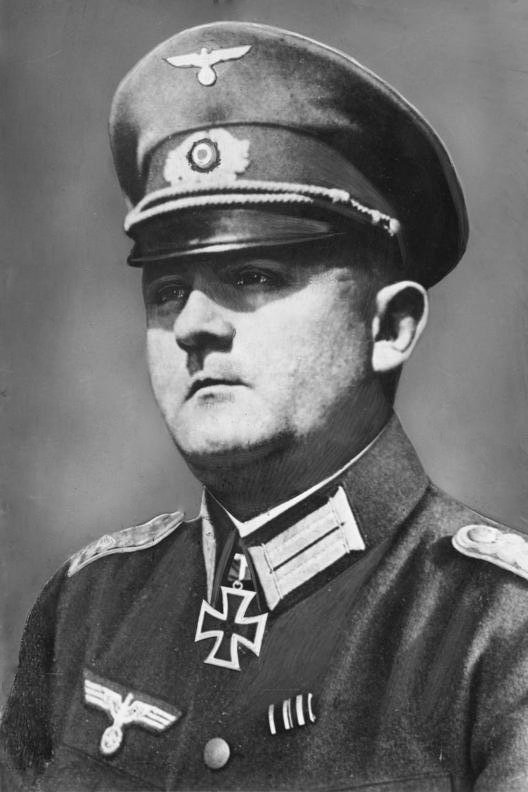
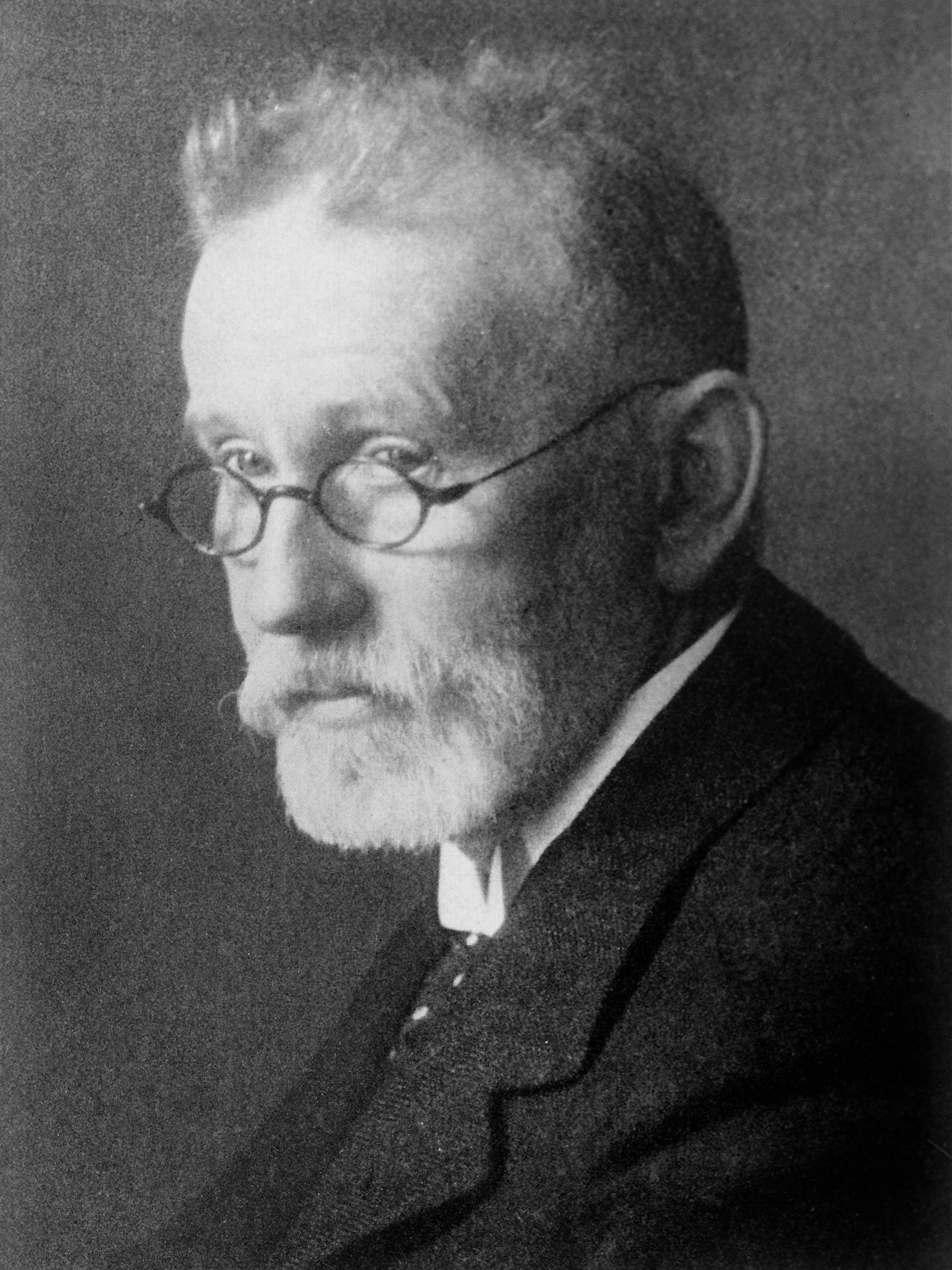
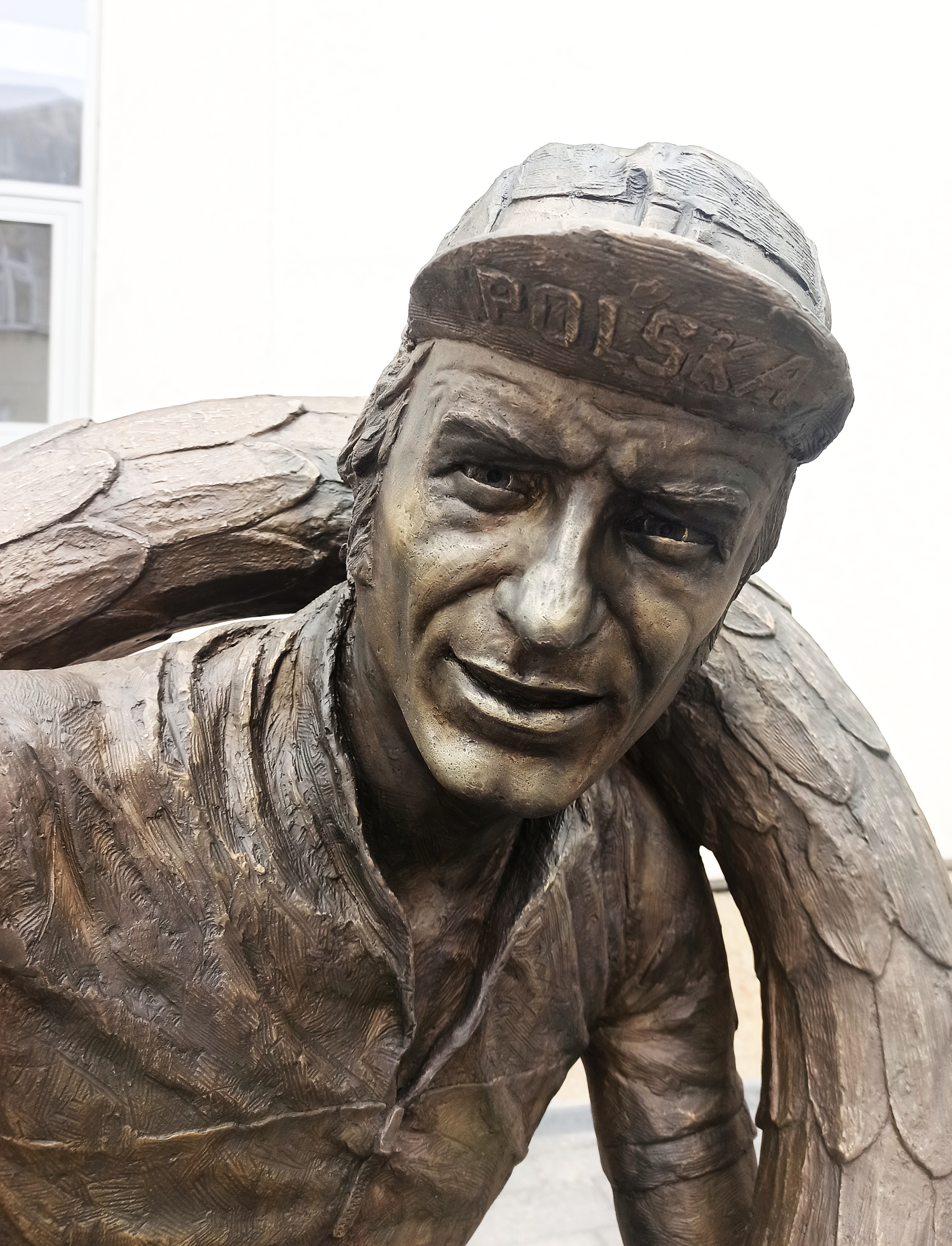
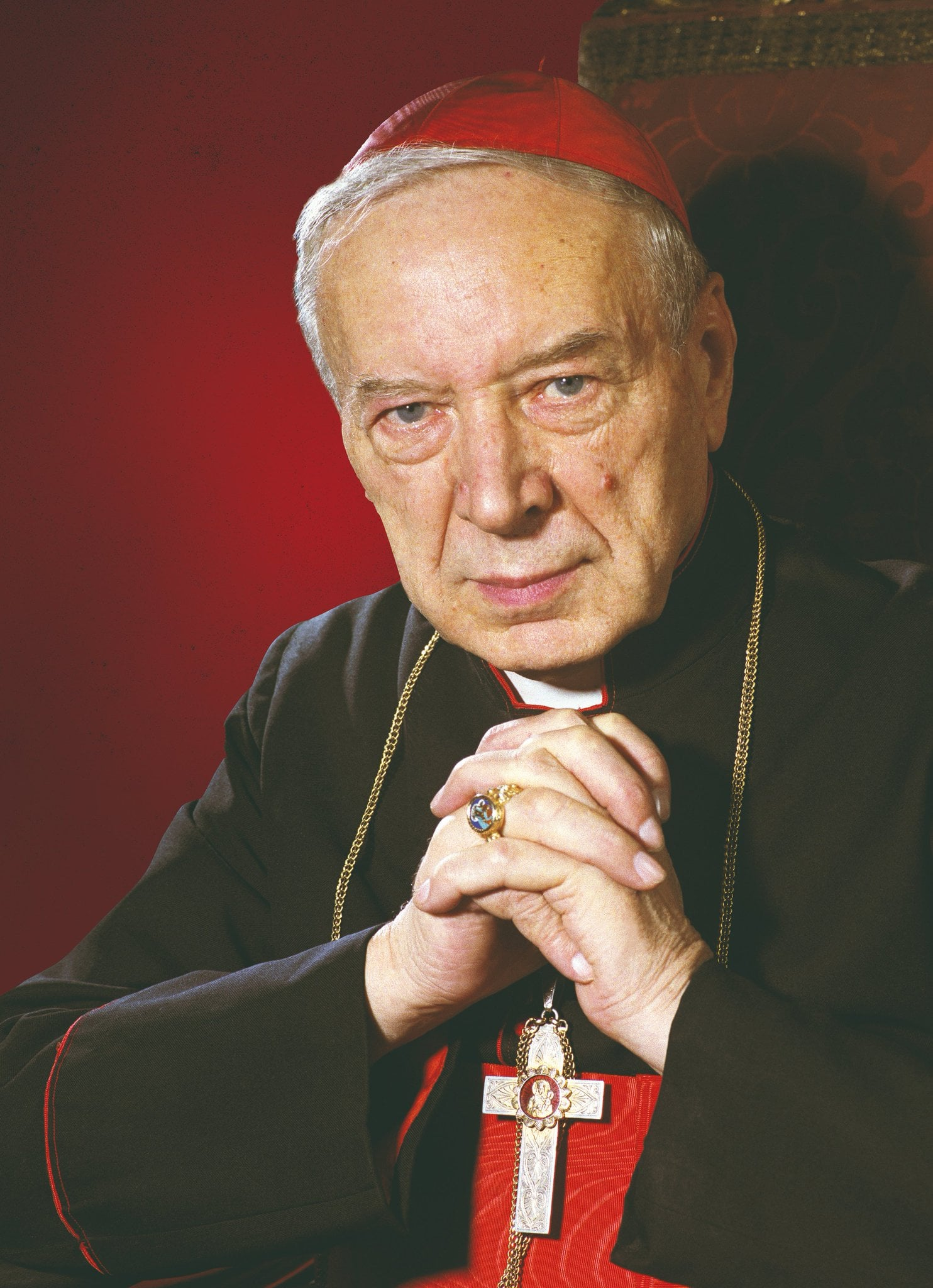
Notable residents of Prudnik, clockwise from upper left: Dietrich von Choltitz, Paul Ehrlich, Stefan Wyszyński, Stanisław Szozda
- Franz Augsberger (1905–1945), German SS officer.
- Edward Barcik (born 1950), Polish cyclist.
- Oscar Theodor Baron (1847–1926), German engineer, explorer and naturalist.
- Andrzej Barszczyński (born 1941), Polish film director.
- Gerard Bernacki (1942–2018), Polish Catholic bishop.
- Gebhard Leberecht von Blücher (1742–1819), Prussian field marshal.
- Dietrich von Choltitz (1894–1966), German general, commander of Nazi-occupied Paris.
- Jerzy Czerwiński (1960–2024), Polish politician.
- Harry Duda (born 1944), Polish poet.
- Paul Ehrlich (1854–1915), Nobel Prize-winning German physician and scientist.
- Joseph Freiherr von Eichendorff (1788–1857), German poet.
- Samuel Fränkel (1801–1881), German industrialist.
- Friedrich Leopold von Gessler (1688–1762), Prussian general.
- Paul Hoecker (1854–1910), German painter.
- Jakub Kania (1872–1957), Polish poet.
- Lukas Klemenz (born 1995), Polish footballer.
- Paul Kollibay (1863–1919), German lawyer and ornithologist.
- Władysław Lemiszko (1911–1988), Polish ice hockey player.
- Paul Heinrich Theodor Müller (1896–?), German SS officer, Schutzhaftlagerführer of Auschwitz.
- Anna Myszyńska (1931–2019), Silesian writer.
- Krzysztof Pieczyński (born 1957), Polish actor.
- Kazimierz Raszewski (1864–1941), Polish general.
- Tadeusz Semik (1889–1978), Polish military officer.
- Józef Stępkowski (born 1970), Polish politician.
- Franciszek Surmiński (1934–2021), Polish cyclist.
- Jadwiga Szoszler-Wilejto (born 1949), Polish archer.
- Stanisław Szozda (1950–2013), Polish cyclist.
- Harry Thürk (1927–2005), German writer.
- Gwala Torbiński (1908–1999), Polish mystic.
- Stefan Wyszyński (1901–1981), Polish Catholic prelate, Primate of Poland.
- Andrzej Zając (born 1956), Polish cyclist.
- Janusz Zarenkiewicz (born 1959), Polish boxer.

== Twin towns – sister cities ==
See twin towns of Gmina Prudnik.

== Bibliography ==
- Dziewulski, Władysław (1973). "Terytorialne podzialy Opolszczyzny w XIII–XV w.". Śląski Kwartalnik Historyczny Sobótka. 28.
- Procner, Lidia; Kowalczyk, Czesław (2007). Sławne postacie pogranicza polsko-czeskiego Euroregionu Pradziad: wspólne dziedzictwo historyczne. Nysa: Starostwo Powiatowe. ISBN 9788360431092.
- Domino, Marcin; Husak, Marcin (2012). Prudnicki cech płócienników do połowy XX wieku ze szczególnym uwzględnieniem rodów fabrykanckich Fränkel i Pinkus. Wrocław: E-Wydawnictwo. Prawnicza i Ekonomiczna Biblioteka Cyfrowa. Wydział Prawa, Administracji i Ekonomii Uniwersytetu Wrocławskiego.
- Dominiak, Wojciech (2016). Prudnik w średniowieczu: studia nad początkami miasta (PDF). Prudnik: Muzeum Ziemi Prudnickiej. ISBN 978-83-63260-62-0.
- Chodkowska, Anna; Chorowska, Małgorzata (2019). Wirtualna rekonstrukcja średniowiecznego zamku w Prudniku.
- Kasza, Ryszard (2020). Ulicami Prudnika z historią i fotografią w tle. Prudnik: Powiat Prudnicki. ISBN 978-83-954314-5-6.
