= Łąka Prudnicka =

- Village
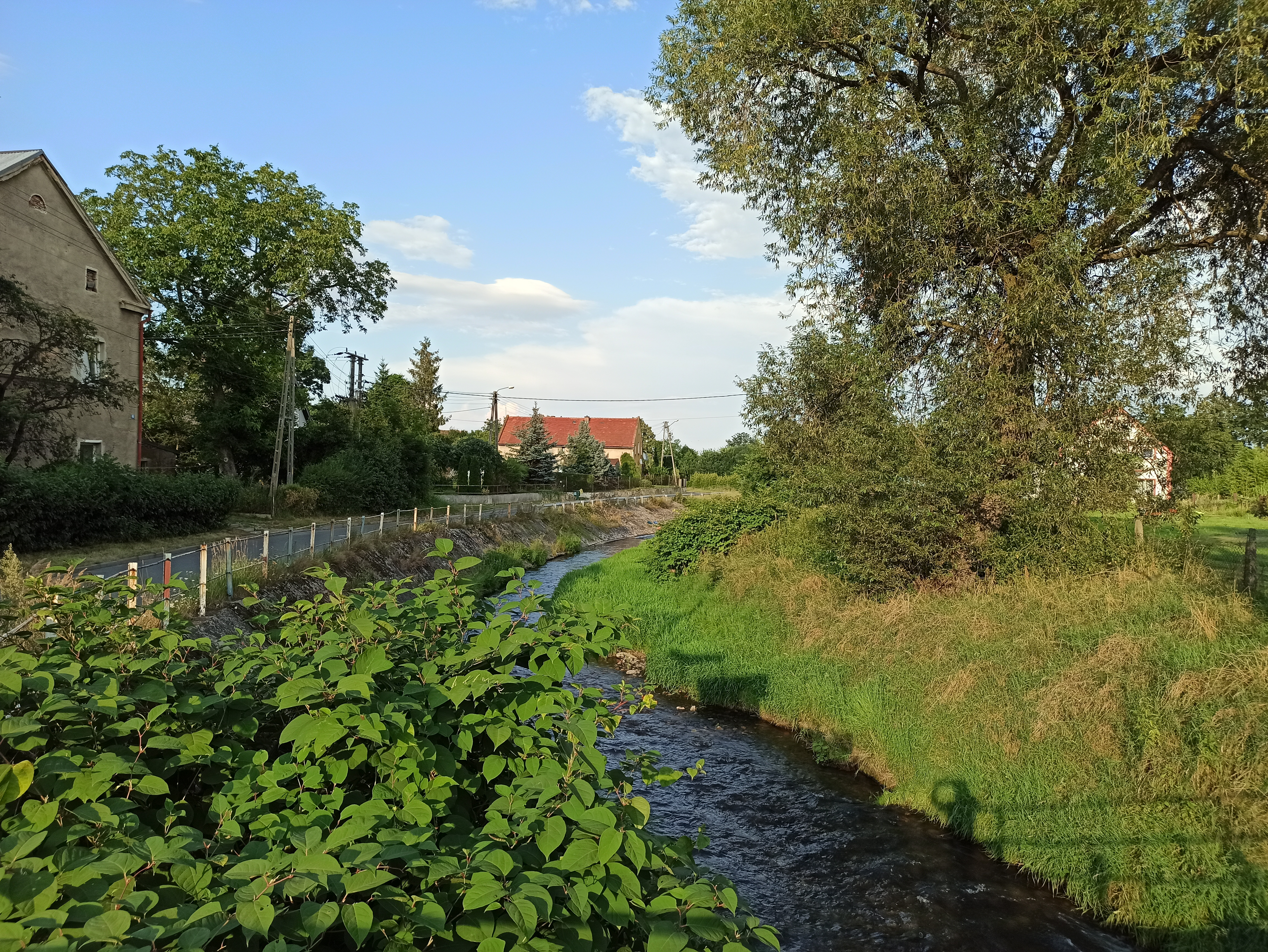

- Coat of arms

- Location within Poland
- Coordinates: 50°18′40″N 17°31′38″E
- Country: Poland
- Voivodeship: Opole
- County: Prudnik
- Gmina: Prudnik
- Highest elevation: 290 m (950 ft)
- Lowest elevation: 265 m (869 ft)

Population
  - Total: 1,270
- Time zone: UTC+1 (CET)
  - Summer (DST): UTC+2 (CEST)
- Vehicle registration: OPR
- Website: lakaprudnicka.org

Łąka Prudnicka [ˈwɔŋka prudˈnit͡ska] (German: Gräflich Wiese) is a village in the administrative district of Gmina Prudnik, within Prudnik County, Opole Voivodeship, in southern Poland, close to the Czech border.

== Geography ==
Łąka Prudnicka is located in the historic Silesia (Upper Silesia) region at the Złoty Potok river. The village is situated on the border of Opawskie Mountains and the Silesian Lowlands.

== History ==
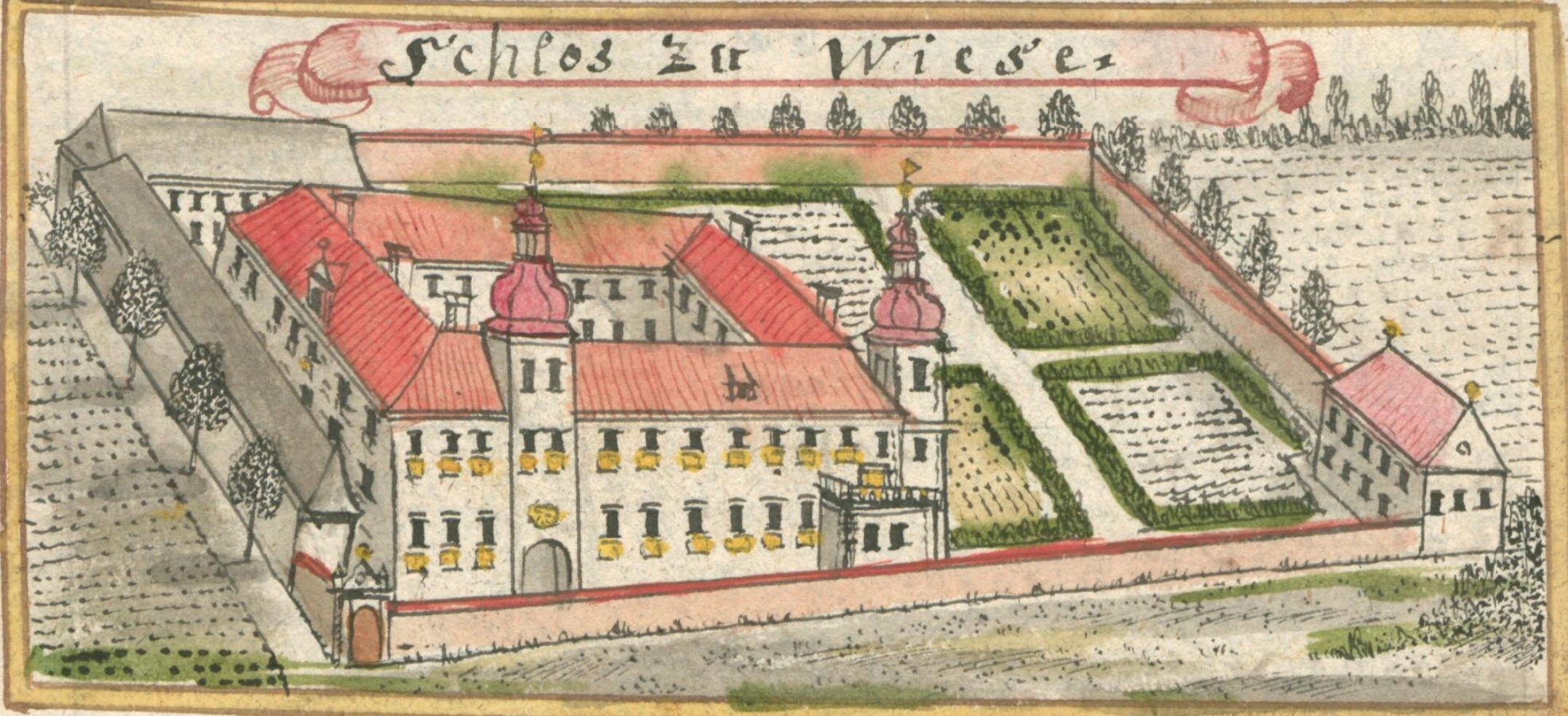
Castle in the 18th century

Łąka Prudnicka was founded as a Waldhufendorf in the second half of the 13th century within medieval Piast-ruled Poland and settled by German colonists. It was first mentioned in 1481.

After the First Silesian War in 1742, Łąka Prudnicka along with most of Silesia was taken over by Prussia.

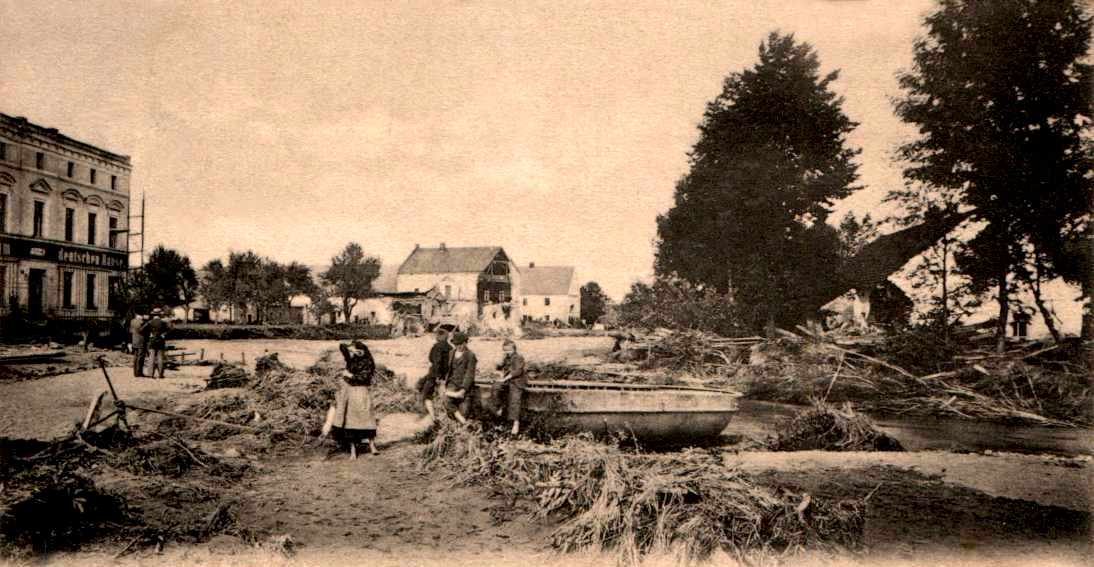
1903 flood

After the reorganization of the province of Silesia, the rural community of Łąka Prudnicka belonged to the Landkreis Neustadt O.S. from 1816 onwards, in the Regierungsbezirk Oppeln. According to Johann Georg Knie, in 1845 there was a castle, an advanced work, two hereditary village leaders, a brewery, a distillery, a Protestant school, a Catholic school and 244 houses in the village. In the same year, 1,670 people lived in Łąka Prudnicka, of which 310 were Protestants and 4 were Jewish. In 1855, 1,707 people lived in Łąka Prudnicka. In 1865 there were 54 farmers, 21 gardeners and 12 cottagers as well as a brewery, a distillery, two schools, two water mills and five bars. The Catholic residents belonged to the parish in Moszczanka, the Protestant residents belonged to the parish in Prudnik. The Catholic school was attended by 240 students in 1865, while the Protestant school had 104 students. In 1874 the administrative district of Łąka Prudnicka (Landgemeinden Wiese Gräflich) was founded, which consisted of the rural communities of Łąka Prudnicka and the manor district of Łąka Prudnicka. The first head of office was the landowner Herrmann von Choltitz. In 1885, Łąka Prudnicka had 2025 inhabitants.

In 1903, a flood destroyed some parts of the village. In 1933 there were 2,226 people in Łąka Prudnicka and 2,105 in 1939. Five Polish citizens were murdered by Nazi Germany in the village during World War II. Until 1945 the village belonged to the Landkreis Neustadt O.S.

After the end defeat of Nazi Germany in World War II, the village became part of Poland and was renamed Łąka Prudnicka. It joined the Śląsko-Dąbrowskie Voivodeship. Since 1950 it is administratively located in Opole Voivodeship, and since 1999 it is in Prudnik County.

== Cultural heritage monuments ==
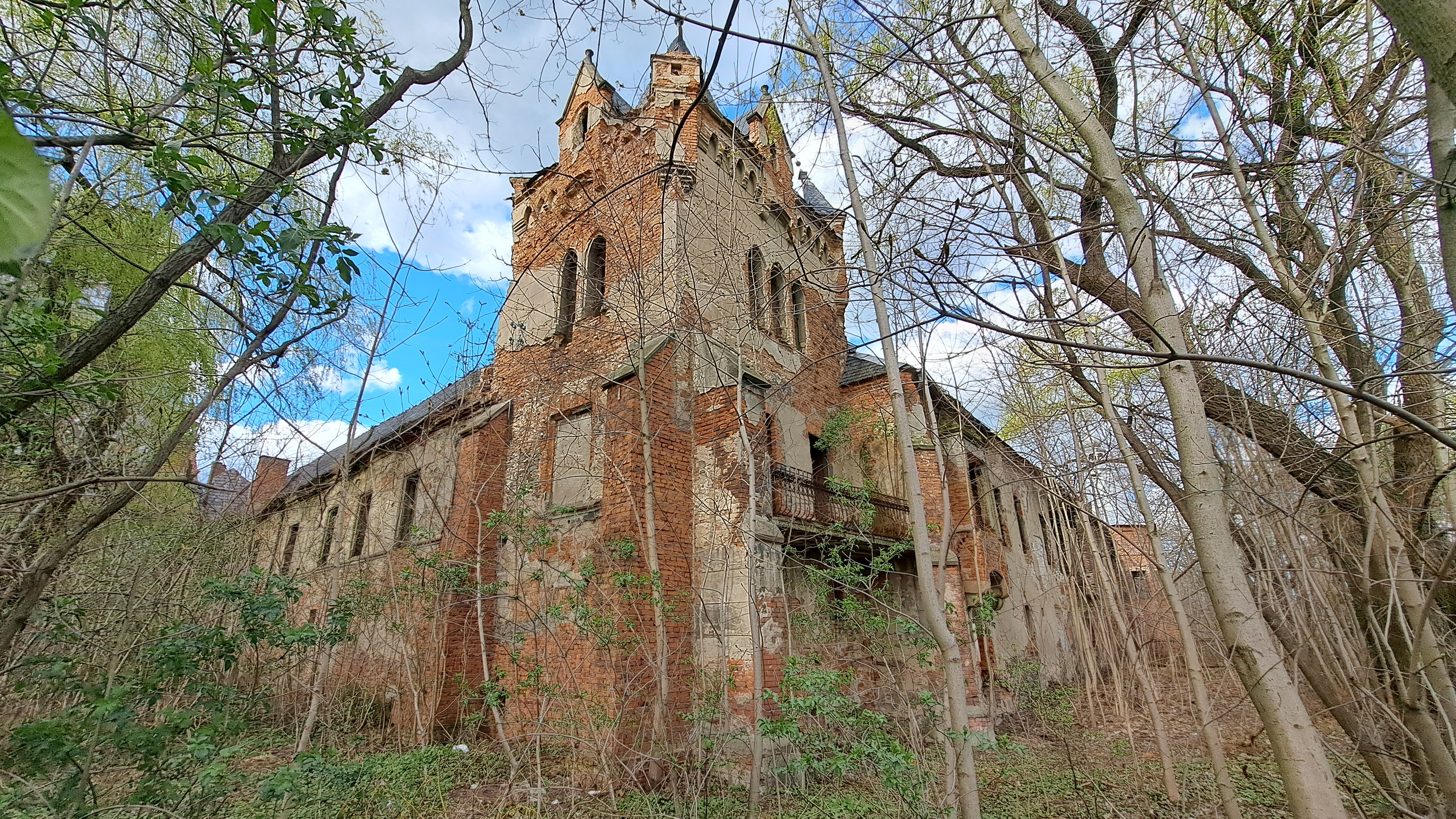
Castle

The following monuments are listed by the Narodowy Instytut Dziedzictwa.

- wayside shrine from the 19th century
- castle from the 15th century
- park

== Notable people ==
- Dietrich von Choltitz (1894–1966), German General

== See also ==
- Prudnik Land
