= Underground Home Army =

Polish military anticommunist organization

- Emblem of the Order of Dobrzyń used by KAP
- Active: October 1949 – January 1952
- Country: Poland

The Underground Home Army (Polish: Krajowa Armia Podziemna Polish pronunciation: [kraˈjɔva ˈarmja pɔdˈʑɛm.na], KAP) was a Polish military anticommunist organization that existed since October 1949 to January 1952. Its headquarter was located in Szybowice.

Krajowa Armia Podziemna was operating mainly in the Prudnik County, Nysa County, Wrocław Voivodeship and Olsztyn Voivodeship.

== History ==
=== Origin of the organisation ===
The originator of KAP was Tomasz Gołąb, member of Freedom and Independence. In October 1949, along with his wife, he visited her cousin Stanisław Stojanowski in Biała. He convinced him to create a secret military organisation, to which they could recruit migrants from Kresy Wschodnie. Its goal was a diversion on Polish People's Army during the expected World War III. Stojanowski, during his friend's wedding in Lubrza, asked Emil Stojanowski from Szybowice to join them.

=== Activities ===
In March 1950, the organisation had 7 members. Ludwik Bartmanowicz, a poruchik after demobilization, was supposed to be its leader, but he declined the offer. Władysław Biernat planned his death in order to prevent his treason. He later ordered the murder of Jan Walasek, an officer of Ministry of Public Security in Prudnik.

In 1951 Hieronim Bednarski commanded an attack on the building of Milicja Obywatelska in a different Voivodeship in order to obtain weapons and original police IDs. On 4 May 1951 KAP attacked "Samopomoc Chłopska" in Lipowa. On 21 May 1951 they attacked and robbed Józef Chudy, a member of the Polish United Workers' Party. On 25 July 1951 they robbed Spółdzielnia Spożywców in Charbielin.

=== Arrest ===
The first mention of an anticommunist organization in Szybowice appeared on 27 January 1950 in the notes of Józef Pleban, a worker of Ministry of Public Security in Prudnik.

Since January to March 1952 the members of Krajowa Armia Podziemna were arrested. Their hearing lasted since April 1952 to February 1953. Many of the members were sentenced. Hieronim Bednarski and Władysława Biernata were sentenced to death.

== Members ==
Members of the KAP were:

- Stanisław "Ogień" Stojanowski from Biała
- Emil "Kościuszko" Stojanowski from Szybowice
- Józef "Lew" Zając from Szybowice
- Jan "Motyl, Klon" Krech from Szybowice
- Władysław "Pantera" Biernat vel Bernaski from Prudnik
- Hieronim "Nawrócony" Bednarski from Szybowice
- Jan Kuszła from Szybowice
- Antoni Rzucidło "Szkop" from Szybowice
- Marian Marciniec from Prudnik
- Piotr Lipniarski from Prudnik
- Stanisław Kołodziej from Szybowice
- Tadeusz "Dąb" Nosko from Szybowice
- Władysław Zieniuk from Mieszowice
- Jan "Jawor" Mazur from Szybowice
- Piotr Dawiskiba from Szybowice
- Tadeusz "Wilk" Krupa from Ząbkowice Śląskie
- Ludwik "Olcha" Bartmanowicz from Szybowice

It's possible that Władysław Cybulka from Szybowice and Rudolf Twardysko from Prudnik also were a part of the organisation, but it was never proven. KAP was also supported by many other people, including those living in Czechoslovakia.

== See also ==
- Cursed soldiers
