= Dębowiec, Opole Voivodeship =

Dębowiec
- Village
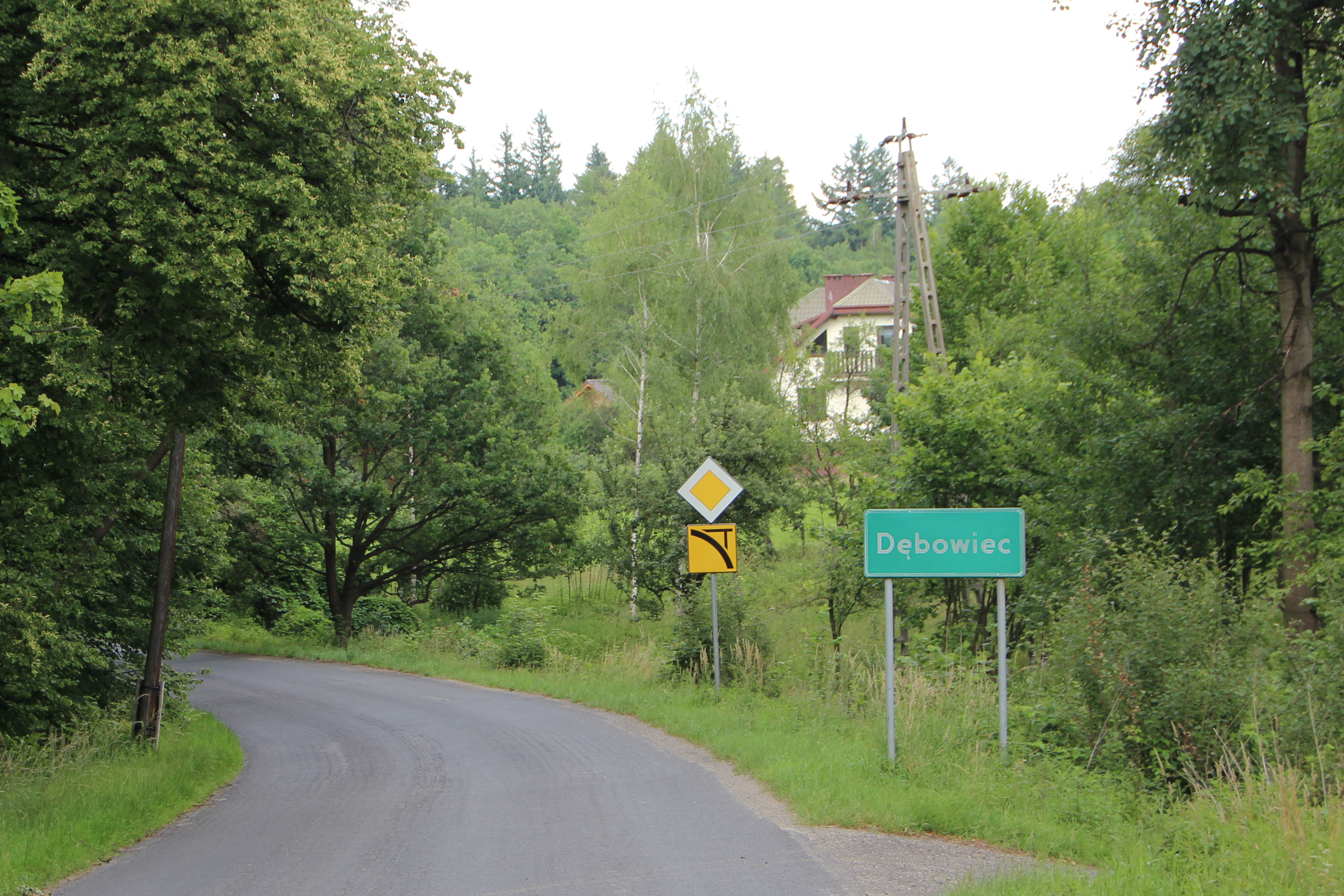

- Location within Poland
- Coordinates: 50°17′1″N 17°32′8″E
- Country: Poland
- Voivodeship: Opole
- County: Prudnik
- Gmina: Prudnik
- Highest elevation: 370 m (1,210 ft)
- Lowest elevation: 305 m (1,001 ft)
- Population: 40

Dębowiec [dɛmˈbɔvjɛt͡s] (German: Eichhäusel-Neudeck) is a village in the administrative district of Gmina Prudnik, within Prudnik County, Opole Voivodeship, in south-western Poland, close to the Czech border.

== Monuments ==
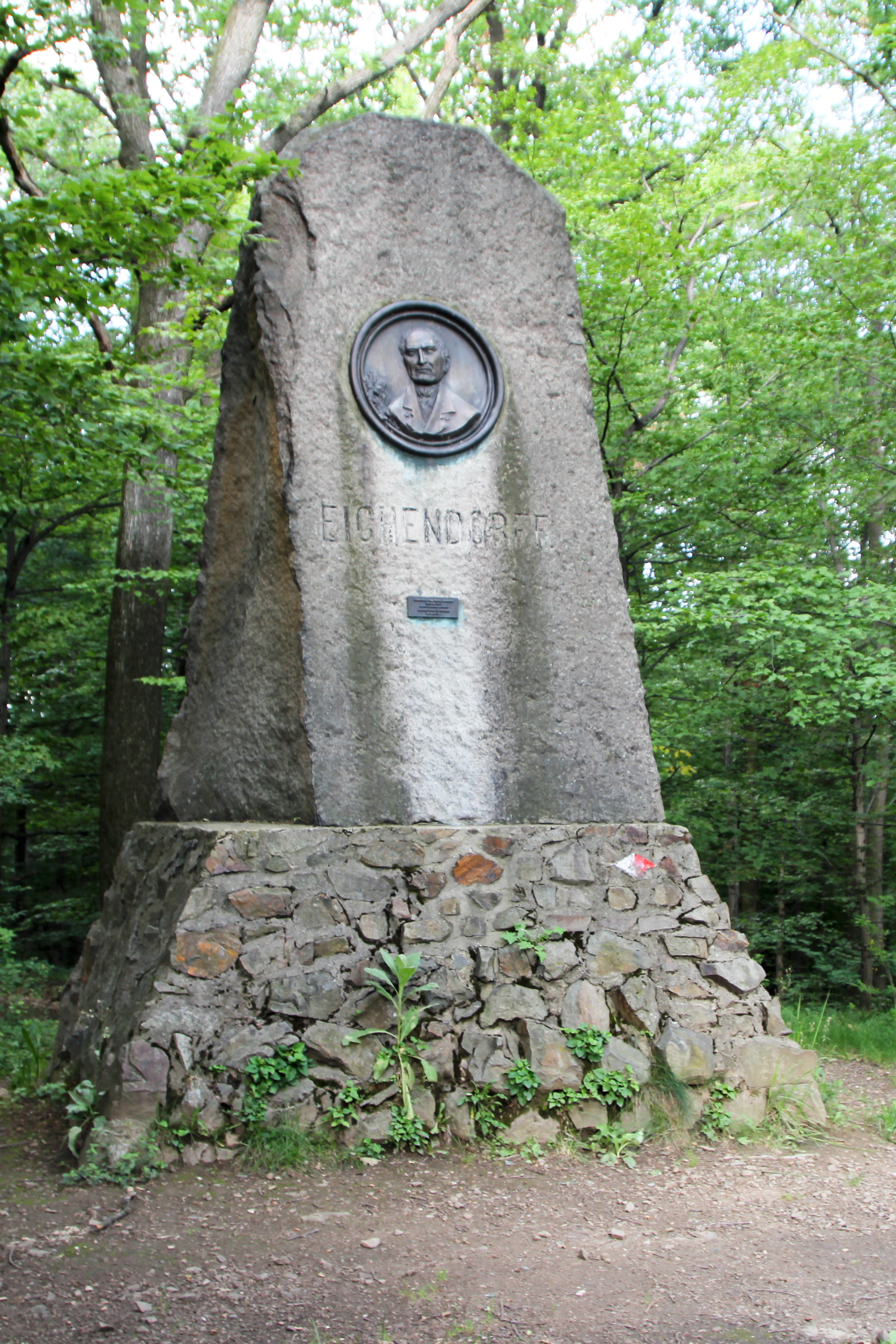
Monument of Joseph von Eichendorff close to Dębowiec

The following monuments are listed by the Narodowy Instytut Dziedzictwa.

- kaplica, z XIX w. (Chapel from the 19th century)
- kaplica przydrożna, z XIX w. (Chapel from the 19th century, close to Wieszczyna)

== See also ==
- Prudnik Land
