= Włóczno =

- Village
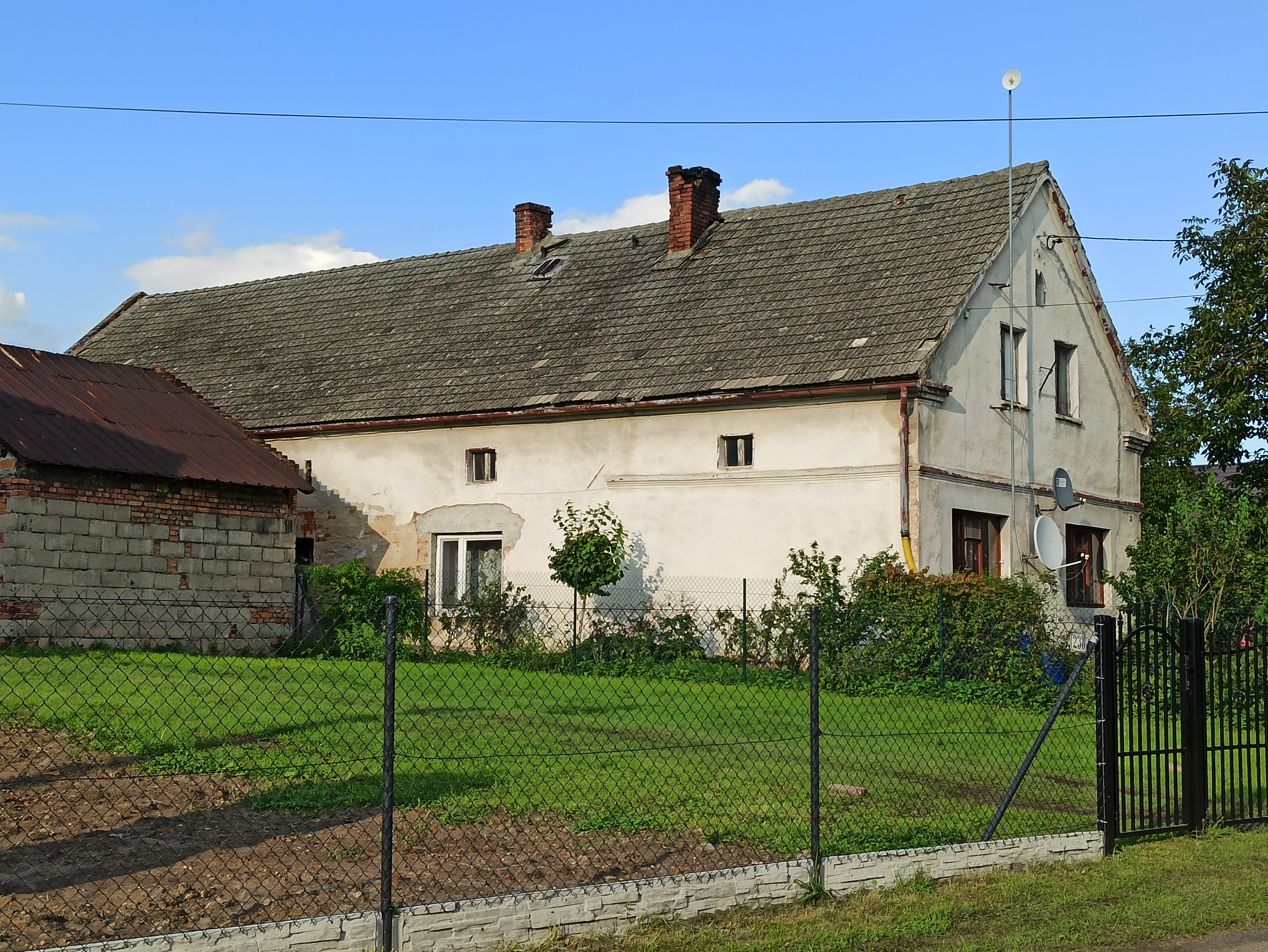
- 19th-century house in Włóczno, a historic monument

- Location within Poland
- Coordinates: 50°20′48″N 17°31′07″E
- Country: Poland
- Voivodeship: Opole
- County: Prudnik
- Gmina: Prudnik

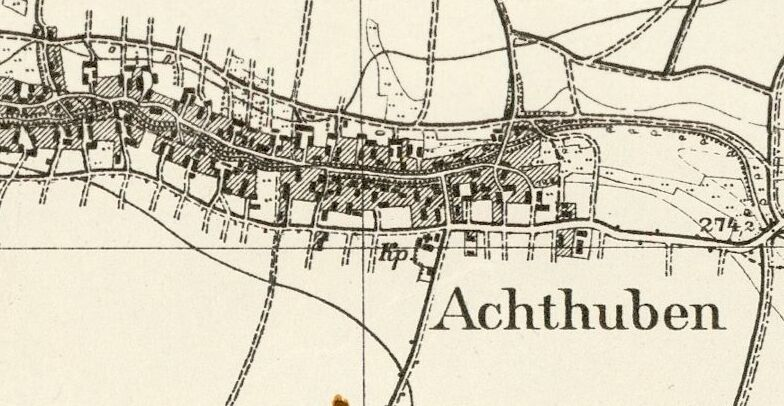
1930 map of the village

Włóczno [vvutʃnɔ] (German: Achthuben, Silesian: Włōczno) is a former village that today forms part of the village of Szybowice in the administrative district of Gmina Prudnik, within Prudnik County, Opole Voivodeship, in south-western Poland, close to the Czech border.

A 19th-century house in the village was added to the Registry of Cultural Property on 10 June 1966.

== History ==
The village was founded, probably in the 13th century, as a forest village that was one of several German settlements in Upper Silesia. The region was part of the Duchy of Poland and subsequently the Kingdom of Poland until the 14th century, when it was incorporated into the Kingdom of Bohemia. In 1742 it became part of the Kingdom of Prussia and in 1871, of the German Empire. Achthuben was the property of a monastery in Nysa (Neisse) until the early 19th century. It had a population of 395 in 1845, 366 in 1885, and 243 in 1933. On 4 January 1939 it became part of Schnellewalde, now Szybowice. In 1945, after the defeat of Germany in World War II, it again became part of Poland. By an act of the Sejm, it was renamed to Włóczno in June 1948.

== See also ==
- Prudnik Land
