= Czyżowice, Opole Voivodeship =

Czyżowice
- Village
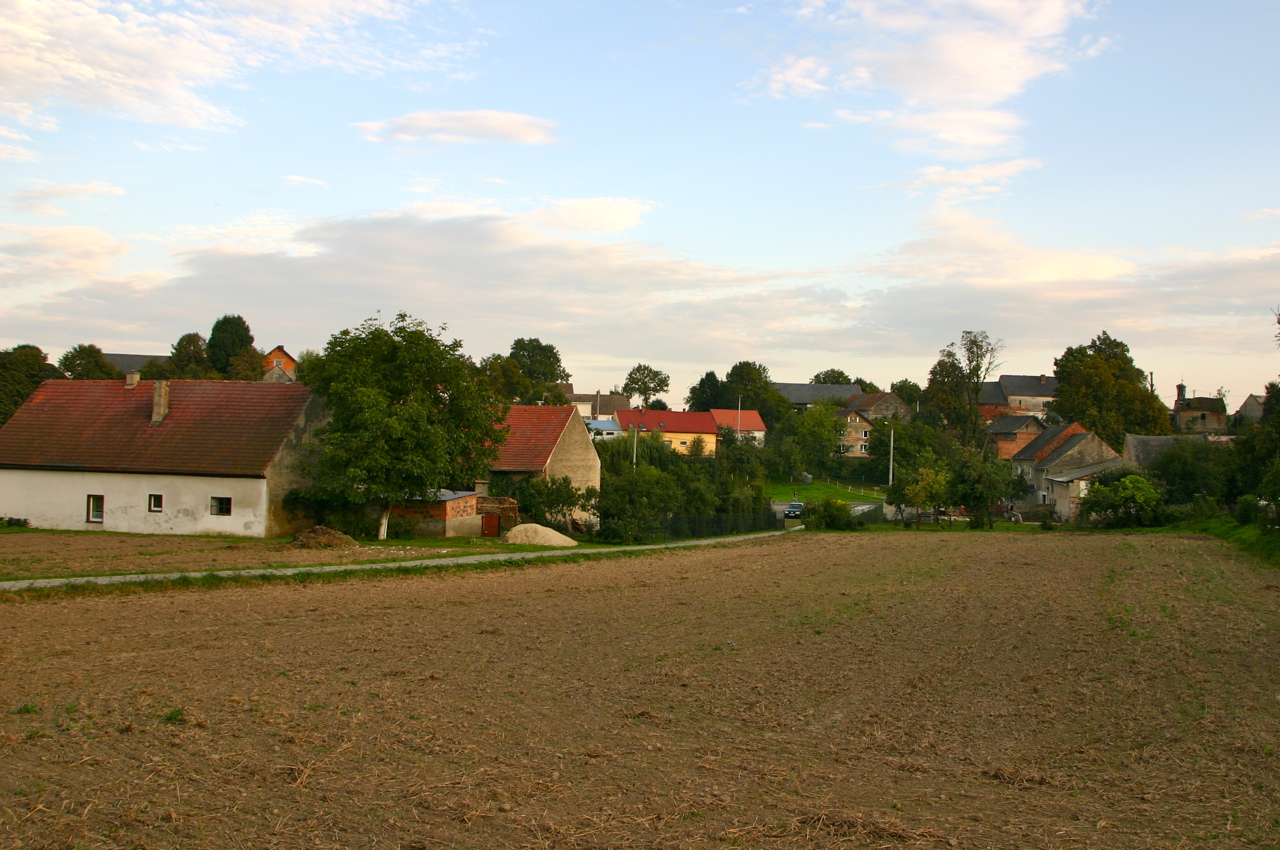

- Location within Poland
- Coordinates: 50°21′44″N 17°35′21″E
- Country: Poland
- Voivodeship: Opole
- County: Prudnik
- Gmina: Prudnik
- Population: 300

Czyżowice [t͡ʂɨʐɔˈvit͡sɛ] (German: Zeiselwitz) is a village in the administrative district of Gmina Prudnik, within Prudnik County, Opole Voivodeship, in south-western Poland, close to the Czech border.

== Monuments ==
The following monuments are listed by the Narodowy Instytut Dziedzictwa.

- kaplica, z 1846 r. (chapel from 1846)
- folwark, z poł. XIX w. (Historic homestead from the 19th century)

== See also ==
- Prudnik Land
