= Moszczanka-Kolonia =

- Village
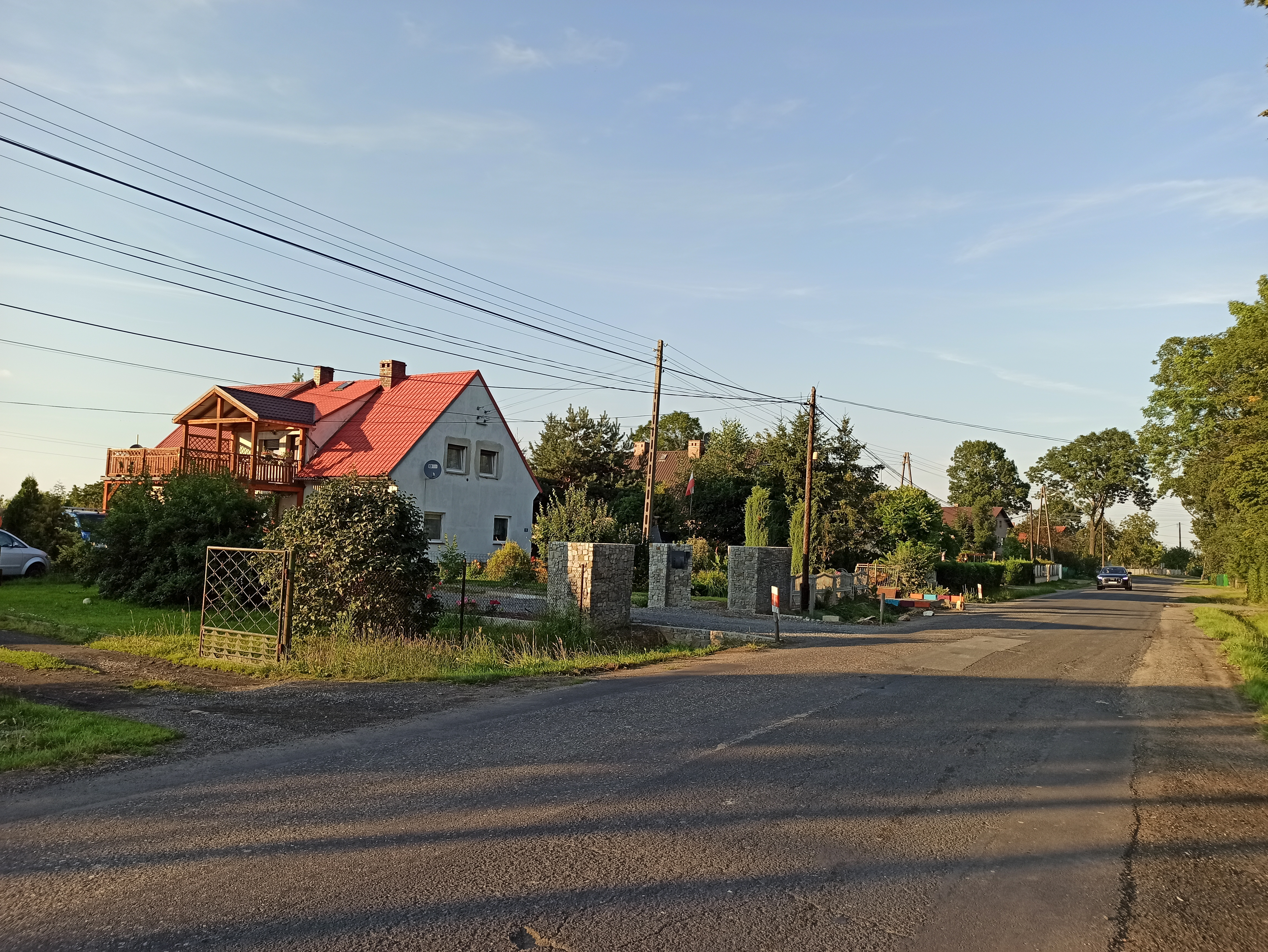

- Location within Poland
- Coordinates: 50°18′08″N 17°29′23″E
- Country: Poland
- Voivodeship: Opole
- County: Prudnik
- Gmina: Prudnik
- Established: 1 January 2006

Population (2016)
  - Total: 90
- Time zone: UTC+1 (CET)
  - Summer (DST): UTC+2
- Postal code: 48-200
- Area code: +4877
- Vehicle registration: OPR

Moszczanka-Kolonia [mɔʂˈt͡ʂanka kɔˈlɔɲja] is a village in the administrative district of Gmina Prudnik, within Prudnik County, Opole Voivodeship, in south-western Poland, close to the Czech border.

The settlement in the area of the present-day village of Moszczanka-Kolonia was developed before the Second World War, north of Moszczanka. The village was established on 1 January 2006. In 2016, there were 90 people living in Moszczanka-Kolonia.

== See also ==
- Prudnik Land
