= Niemysłowice =

- Village
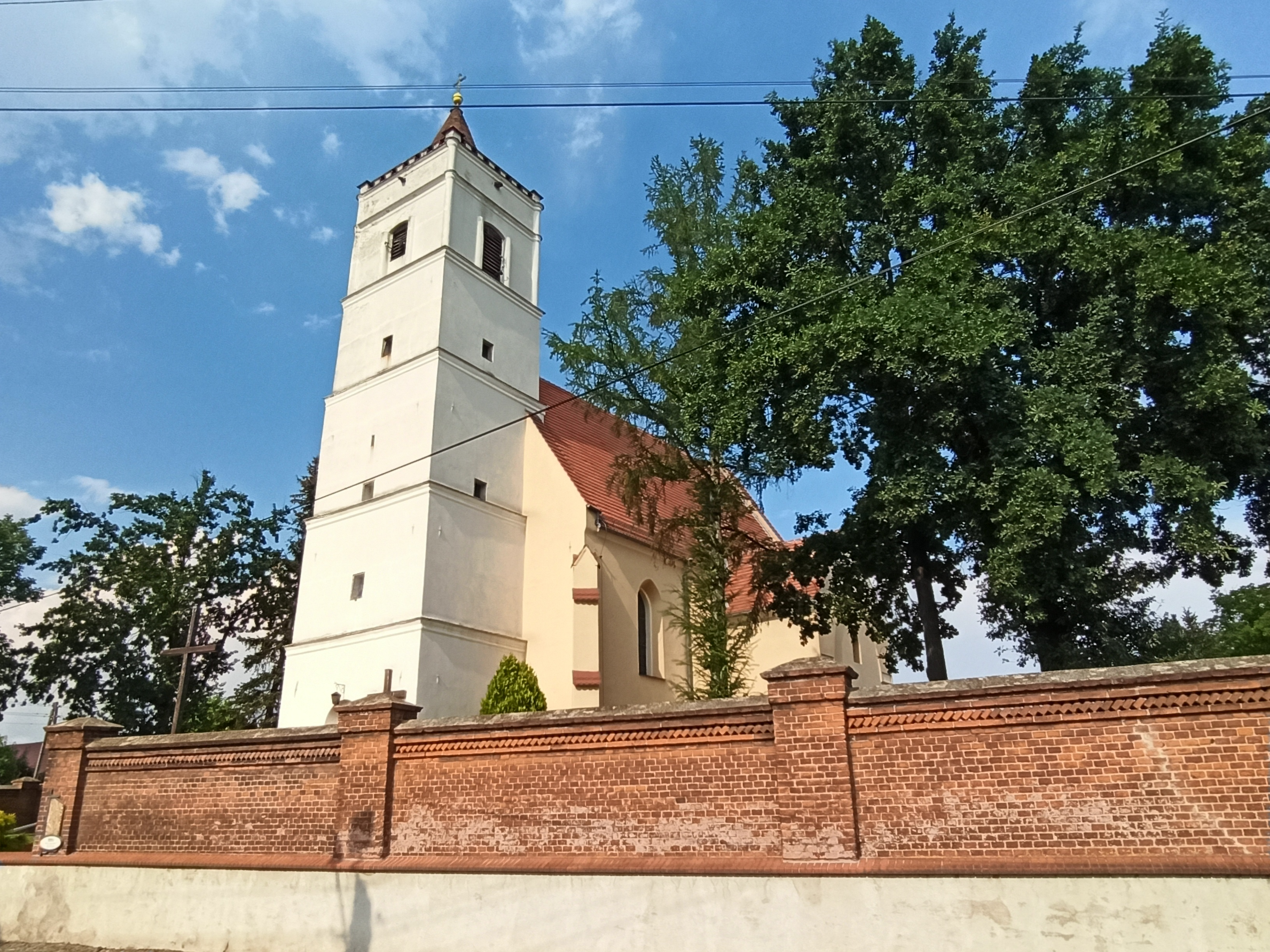
- Church of Saint Anne

- Coat of arms

- Location within Poland
- Coordinates: 50°20′41″N 17°33′19″E
- Country: Poland
- Voivodeship: Opole
- County: Prudnik
- Gmina: Prudnik
- Highest elevation: 296 m (971 ft)
- Lowest elevation: 255 m (837 ft)

Population
  - Total: 724
- Website: www.niemyslowice.pl

Niemysłowice [ɲɛmɨswɔˈvit͡sɛ] (German: Buchelsdorf) is a village in the administrative district of Gmina Prudnik, within Prudnik County, Opole Voivodeship, in south-western Poland, close to the Czech border.

== See also ==
- Prudnik Land
