= Mieszkowice, Opole Voivodeship =

Mieszkowice
- Village
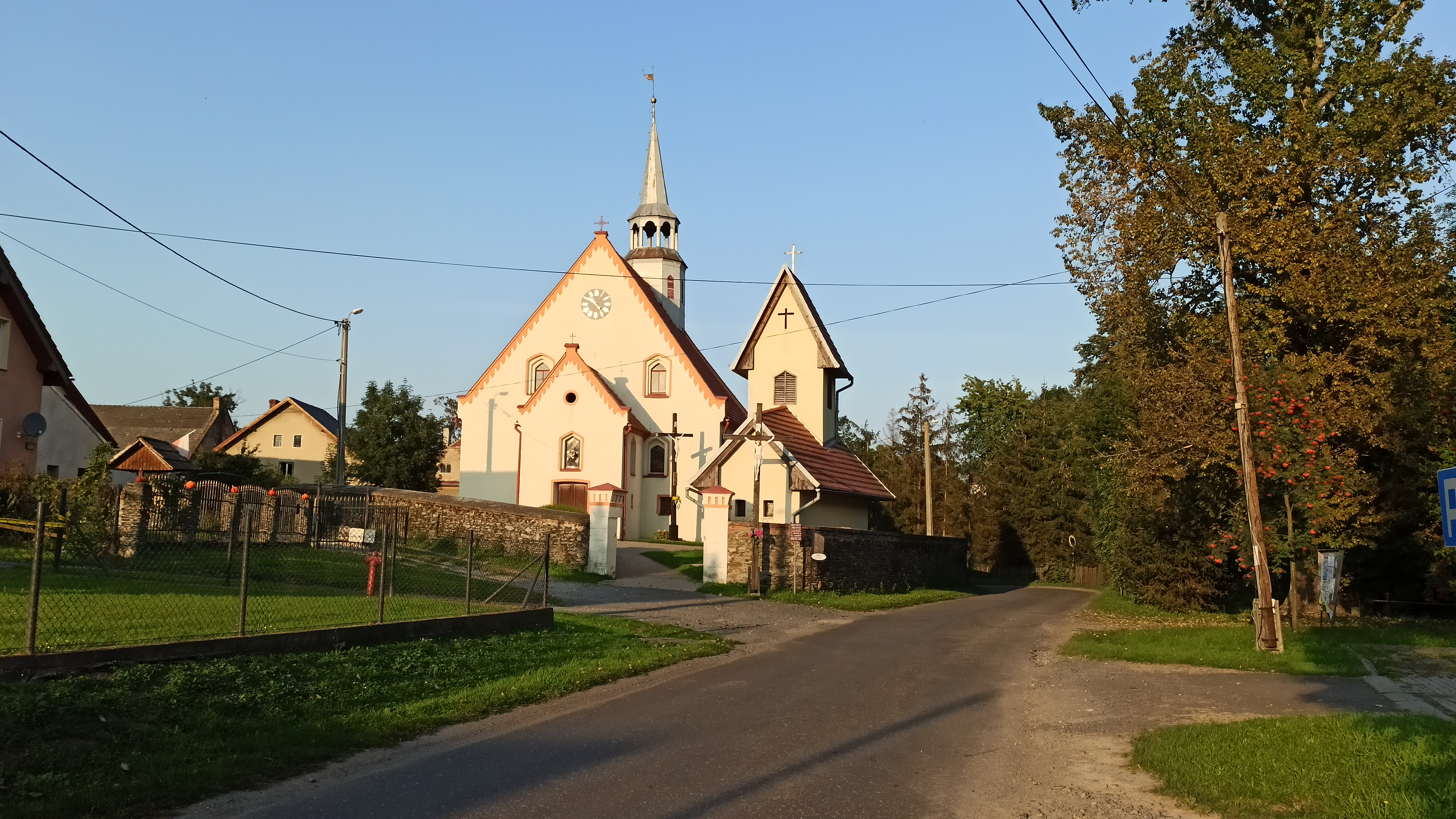
- St George's church

- Location within Poland
- Coordinates: 50°22′56″N 17°28′59″E
- Country: Poland
- Voivodeship: Opole
- County: Prudnik
- Gmina: Prudnik
- Highest elevation: 306 m (1,004 ft)
- Lowest elevation: 250 m (820 ft)
- Population: 451
- Time zone: UTC+1 (CET)
  - Summer (DST): UTC+2 (CEST)
- Vehicle registration: OPR

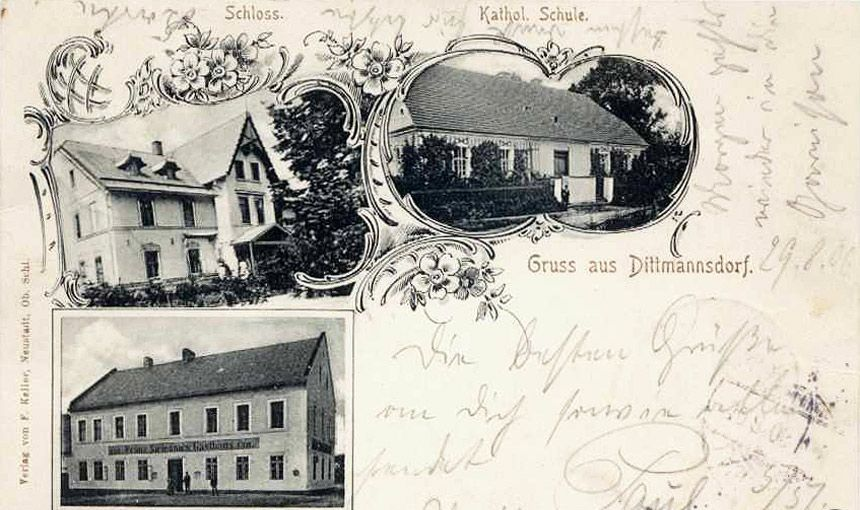
1906 postcard

Mieszkowice [mjɛʂkɔˈvit͡sɛ] (German: Dittmannsdorf) is a village in the administrative district of Gmina Prudnik, within Prudnik County, Opole Voivodeship, in southern Poland, close to the Czech border.

The village had a population of 451 in 2011. St George's Catholic church, originally built in the 16th century as a Lutheran church, was added to the Registry of Cultural Property on 15 January 1955.

== History ==
The village was founded, probably in the 13th century, as a forest village that was one of several German settlements in Upper Silesia. Its name was recorded as Ditmarsdorff in 1464. The region was part of the Duchy of Poland until the 14th century, when it was incorporated into the Kingdom of Bohemia. In 1742 it became part of the Kingdom of Prussia and in 1871, of the German Empire. In 1845, Dittmannsdorf had a population of 1,246, a Catholic church, Catholic and Lutheran schools; in 1885, the population was 1,141. In 1945, after the defeat of Germany in World War II, it again became part of Poland.

== See also ==
- Prudnik Land
