= Gajówka, Prudnik County =

Gajówka
- Village
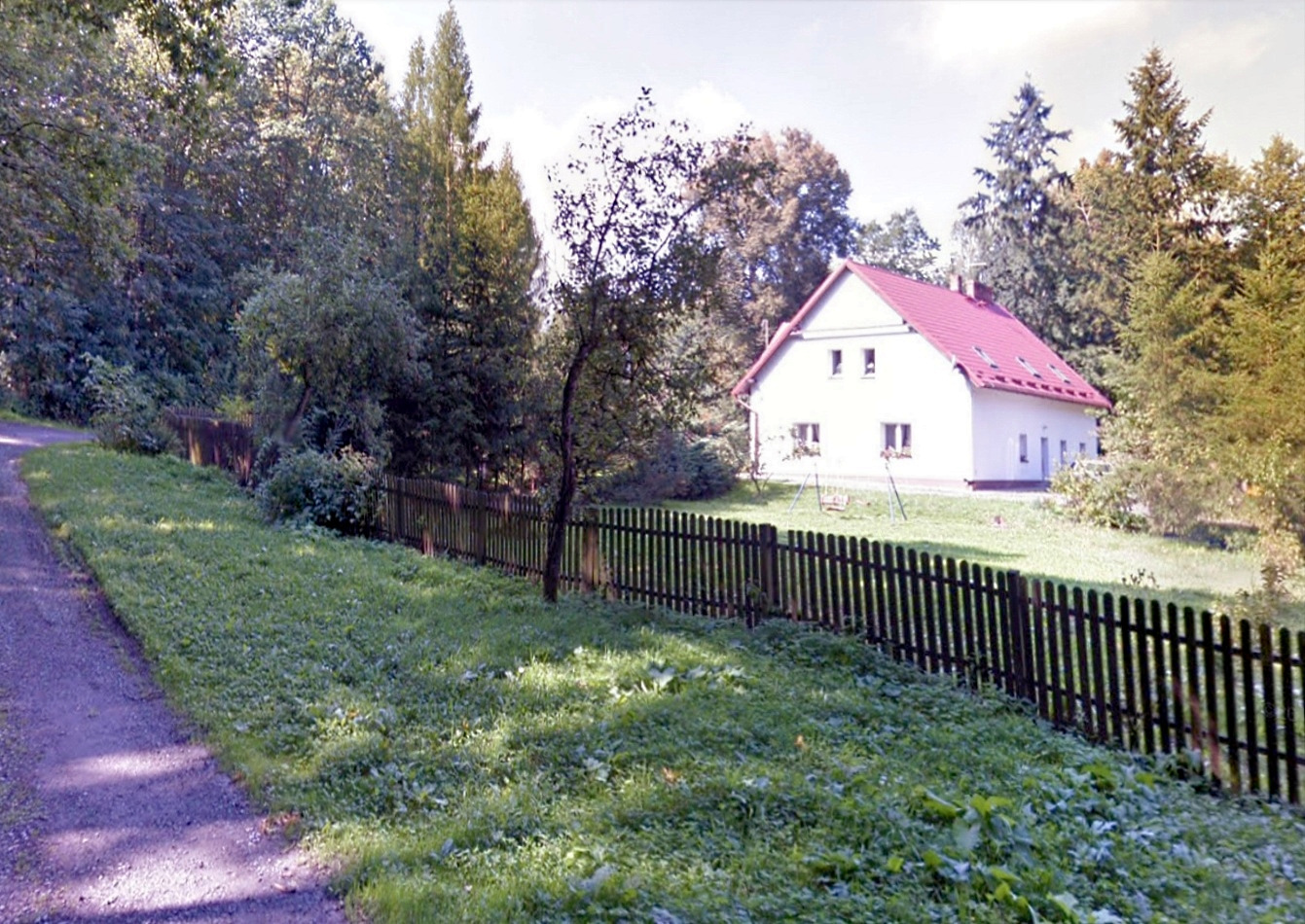

- Location within Poland
- Coordinates: 50°23′38.327″N 17°32′46.849″E
- Country: Poland
- Voivodeship: Opole
- County: Prudnik
- Gmina: Prudnik

Gajówka [ɡaˈjufka] is a village in the administrative district of Gmina Prudnik, within Prudnik County, Opole Voivodeship, in south-western Poland, close to the Czech border.

== See also ==
- Prudnik Land
