= Zimne Kąty =

- Village
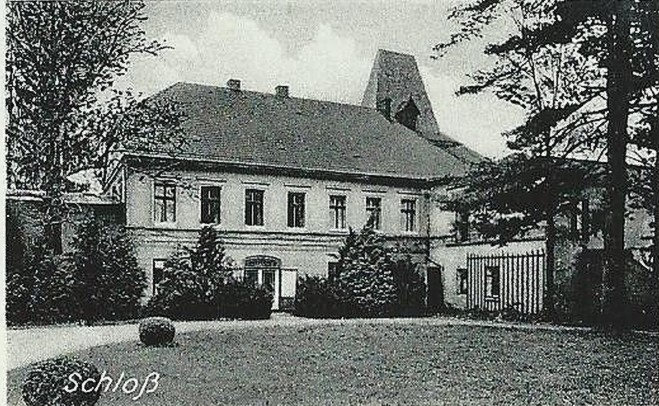
- Castle in Zimne Kąty (c. 1925)

- Location within Poland
- Coordinates: 50°23′23.483″N 17°32′14.750″E
- Country: Poland
- Voivodeship: Opole
- County: Prudnik
- Gmina: Prudnik

Zimne Kąty [ˈʑimnɛ ˈkɔntɨ] (German: Kaltvorwerk) is a village in the administrative district of Gmina Prudnik, within Prudnik County, Opole Voivodeship, in south-western Poland, close to the Czech border.

== See also ==
- Prudnik Land
