= Trzebieszów, Opole Voivodeship =

Trzebieszów
- Village
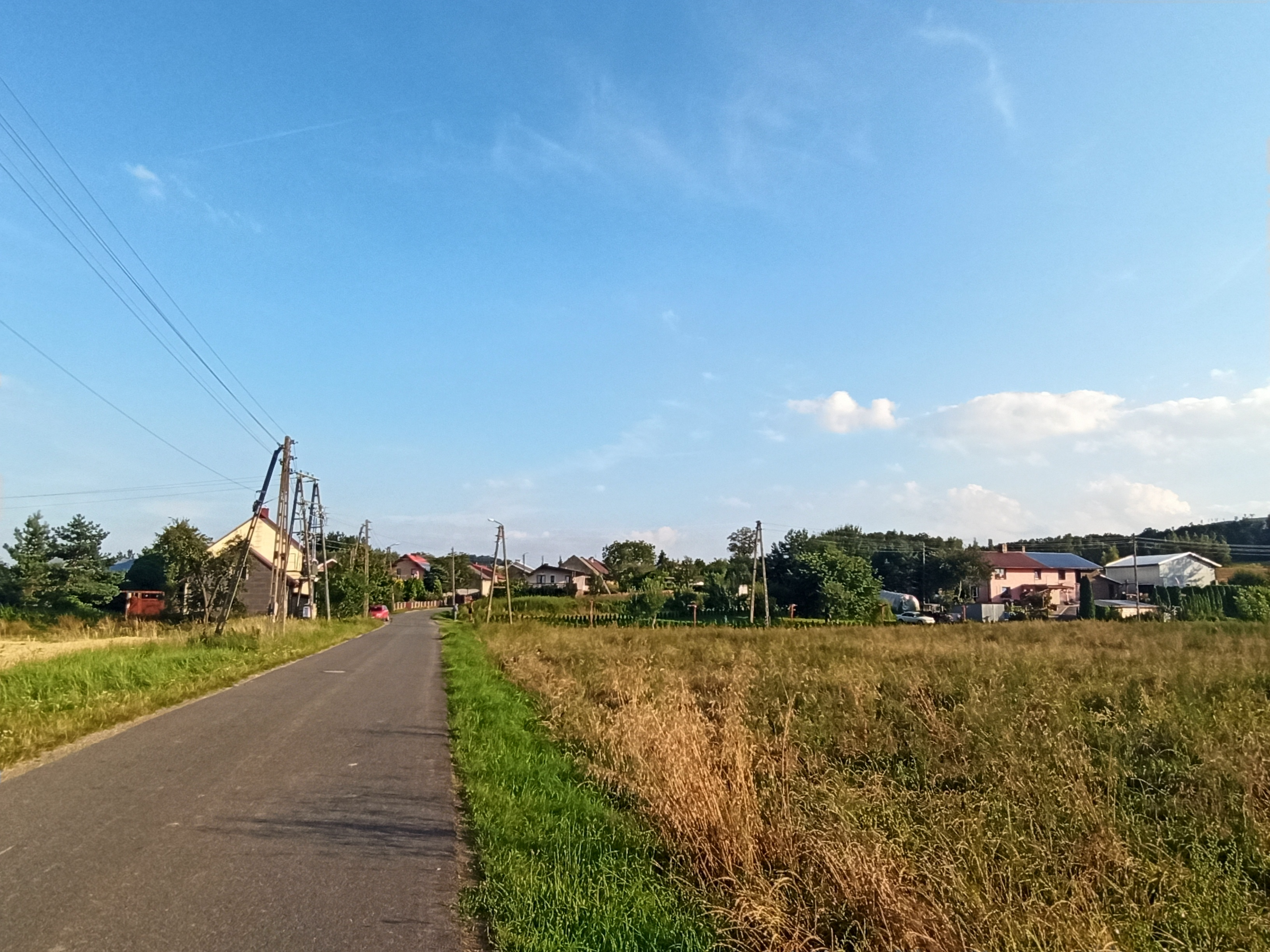

- Location within Poland
- Coordinates: 50°17′16.8″N 17°29′14.6″E
- Country: Poland
- Voivodeship: Opole
- County: Prudnik
- Gmina: Prudnik

Trzebieszów [tʒɛbiɛʃuv] (German: Sichdichfür) is a village in the administrative district of Gmina Prudnik, within Prudnik County, Opole Voivodeship, in south-western Poland, close to the Czech border.

== See also ==
- Prudnik Land
