= Bombreit =

- Village
- Location within Poland
- Coordinates: 50°19′42″N 17°29′16″E
- Country: Poland
- Voivodeship: Opole
- County: Prudnik
- Gmina: Prudnik

Bombreit is a former village in the administrative district of Gmina Prudnik, within Prudnik County, Opole Voivodeship, in south-western Poland, close to the Czech border.

According to Meyers Gazetteer (published in 1912), eight people lived in Bombreit. Currently, the village is uninhabited.
