= Spalony Dwór =

- Village
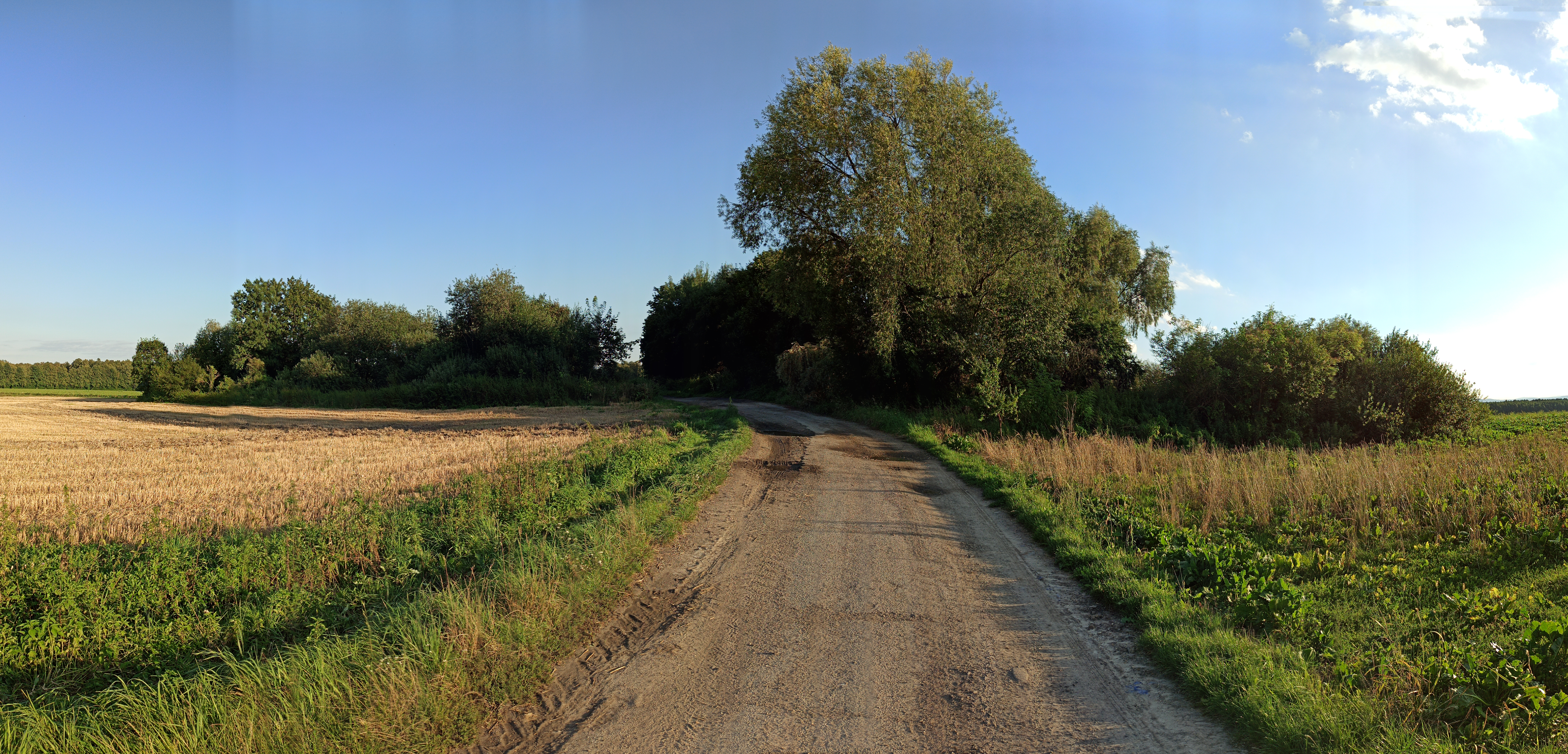

- Location within Poland
- Coordinates: 50°19′56″N 17°32′03″E
- Country: Poland
- Voivodeship: Opole
- County: Prudnik
- Gmina: Prudnik

Spalony Dwór [spaˈlɔ.nɨ dvur] is a village in the administrative district of Gmina Prudnik, within Prudnik County, Opole Voivodeship, in south-western Poland, close to the Czech border.

According to Meyers Gazetteer, 13 people lived in Spalony Dwór. Currently the village is uninhabited.
