= Wierzbiec =

- Village
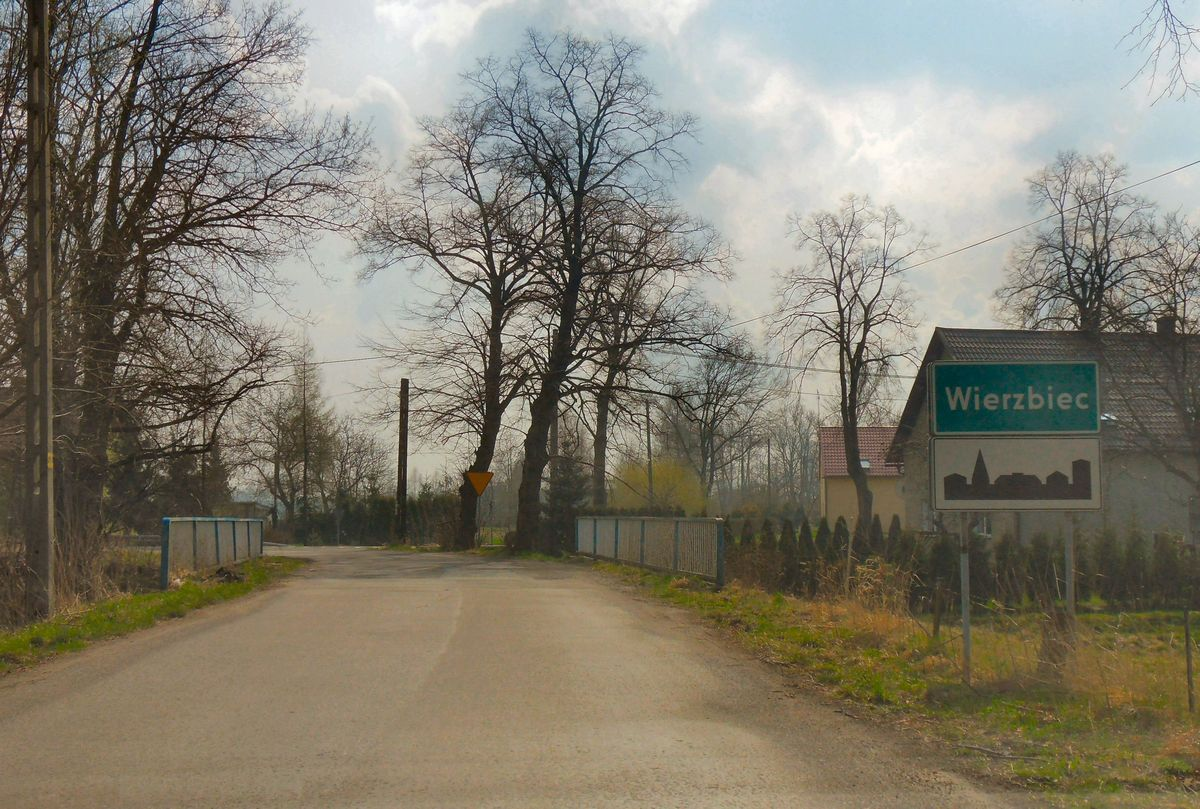

- Location within Poland
- Coordinates: 50°19′43″N 17°28′36″E
- Country: Poland
- Voivodeship: Opole
- County: Prudnik
- Gmina: Prudnik
- Highest elevation: 320 m (1,050 ft)
- Lowest elevation: 275 m (902 ft)
- Population: 242

Wierzbiec [ˈvjɛʐbjɛt͡s] (German: Wackenau) is a village in the administrative district of Gmina Prudnik, within Prudnik County, Opole Voivodeship, in south-western Poland, close to the Czech border.

== See also ==
- Prudnik Land
