= Gmina Prudnik =

Gmina Prudnik Prudnik Commune
- Gmina
- Flag Coat of arms
- Interactive map of Gmina Prudnik
- Coordinates (Prudnik): 50°19′22″N 17°34′36″E
- Country: Poland
- Voivodeship: Opole
- County: Prudnik
- Seat: Prudnik

Area
  - Total: 122.13 km^{2} (47.15 sq mi)

Population (2019-06-30)
  - Total: 27,157
  - Density: 222.36/km^{2} (575.91/sq mi)
  - Urban: 21,041
  - Rural: 6,116
- Website: https://prudnik.pl

Gmina Prudnik is an urban-rural gmina (administrative district) in Prudnik County, Opole Voivodeship, in south-western Poland, on the Czech border. Its seat is the town of Prudnik, which lies approximately 46 kilometres (29 mi) south-west of the regional capital Opole.

The gmina covers an area of 122.13 square kilometres (47.2 sq mi), and as of 2019 its total population is 27,157.

The gmina contains part of the protected area called Opawskie Mountains Landscape Park.

== Villages ==
Apart from the town of Prudnik, Gmina Prudnik contains the villages and settlements of Bombreit, Chocim, Czyżowice, Dębowiec, Gajówka, Łąka Prudnicka, Mieszkowice, Moszczanka, Moszczanka-Kolonia, Niemysłowice, Osiedle, Piorunkowice, Rudziczka, Siemków, Spalony Dwór, Szybowice, Trzebieszów, Wierzbiec, Wieszczyna, Włóczno, Włókna, Zimne Kąty.

== Neighbouring gminas ==
Gmina Prudnik is bordered by the gminas of Biała, Głuchołazy, Korfantów, Lubrza and Nysa. It also borders the Czech Republic.

== Twin towns – sister cities ==
Gmina Prudnik is twinned with:

- Bohumín, Czech Republic (2000)
- Krnov, Czech Republic (2002)
- Nadvirna, Ukraine (2000)
- Northeim, Germany (1990)
- San Giustino, Italy (2002)
