= Rudziczka, Opole Voivodeship =

Rudziczka
- Village
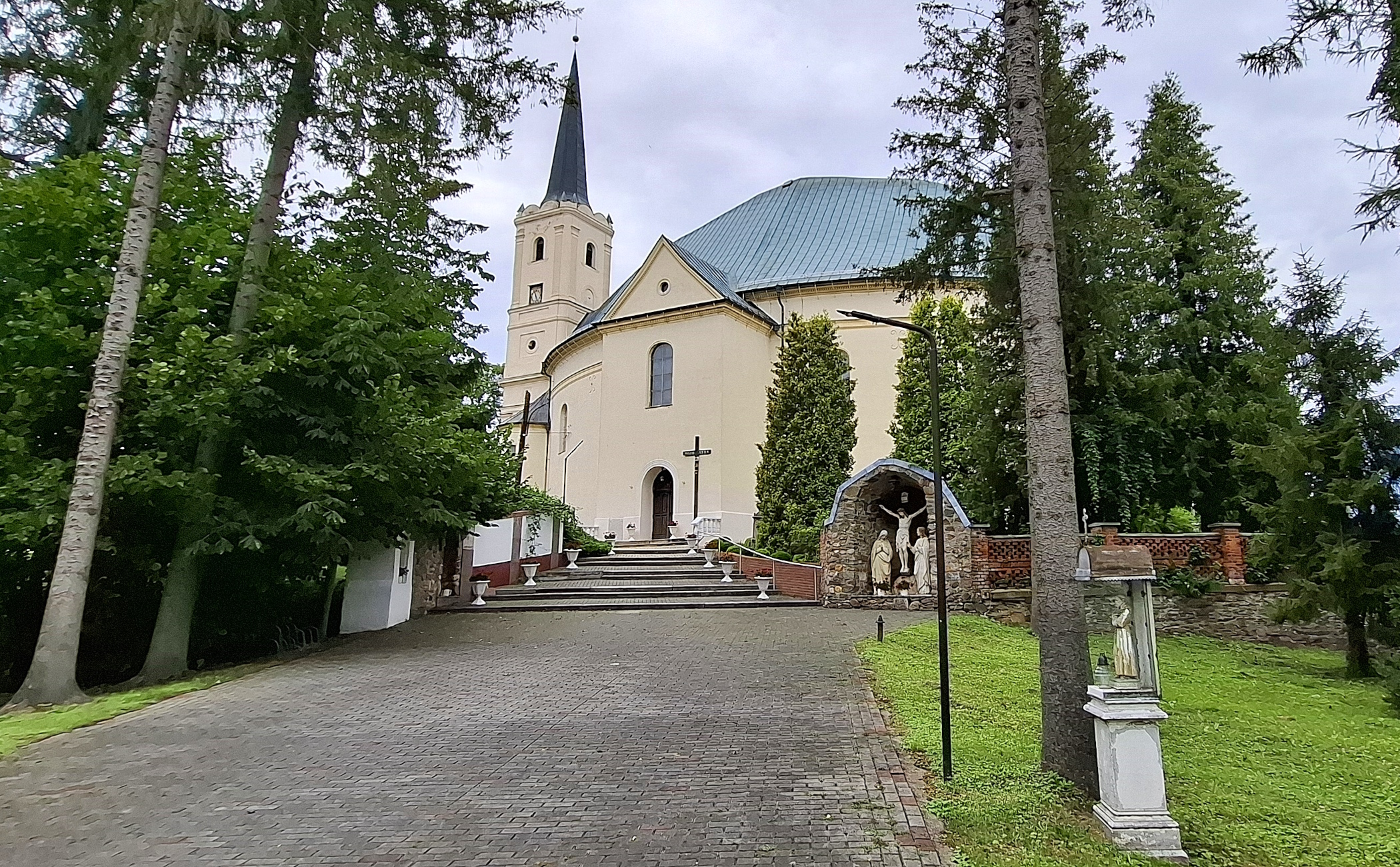
- Catholic church

- Location within Poland
- Coordinates: 50°22′56″N 17°31′27″E
- Country: Poland
- Voivodeship: (Opolskie Voivodeship) Opole
- County: Prudnik
- Gmina: Prudnik
- Highest elevation: 298 m (978 ft)
- Lowest elevation: 245 m (804 ft)
- Population: 950

Rudziczka [ruˈd͡ʑit͡ʂka] (German: Riegersdorf) is a village in the administrative district of Gmina Prudnik, within Prudnik County, Opole Voivodeship, in south-western Poland, close to the Czech border.

== Notable people ==
- Franciszek Surmiński (1934–2021), Polish racing cyclist

== See also ==
- Prudnik Land
