= Chocim, Opole Voivodeship =

Chocim
- Village
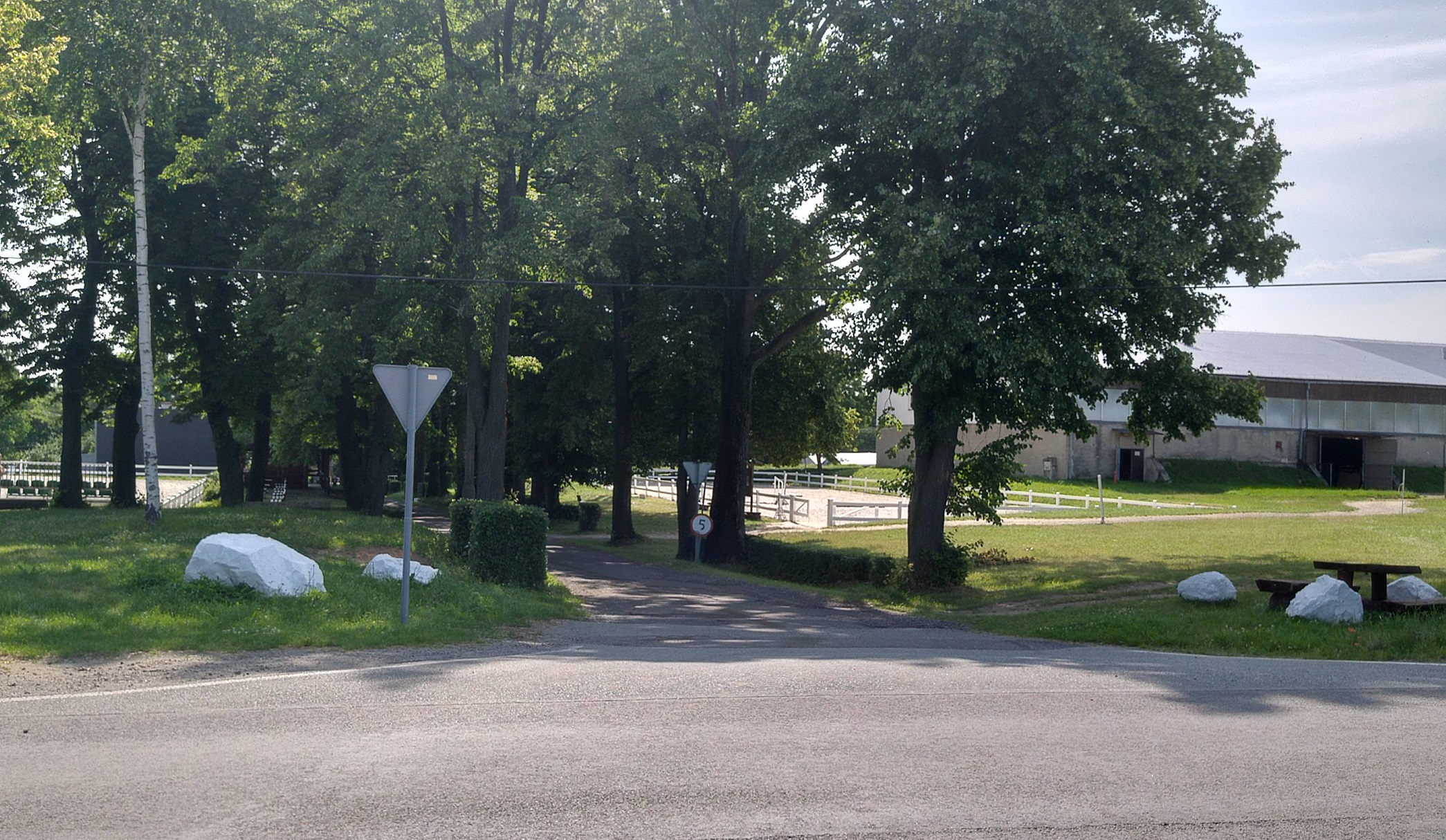

- Location within Poland
- Coordinates: 50°18′8″N 17°32′41″E
- Country: Poland
- Voivodeship: Opole
- County: Prudnik
- Gmina: Prudnik
- Highest elevation: 315 m (1,033 ft)
- Lowest elevation: 300 m (980 ft)

Chocim [ˈxɔt͡ɕim] (German: Kotzem) is a village in the administrative district of Gmina Prudnik, within Prudnik County, Opole Voivodeship, in south-western Poland, close to the Czech border.

== See also ==
- Prudnik Land
