= Franciszek Surmiński =

Polish racing cyclist (1934–2021)

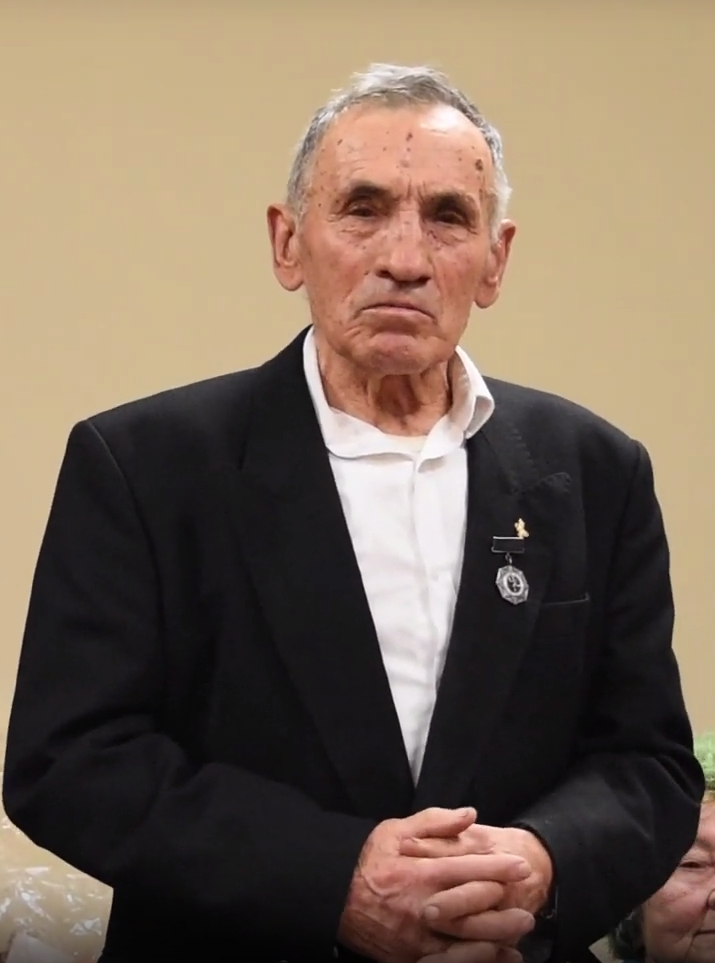
- Surmiński in 2019

Personal information
- Born: 5 December 1934 Dmukhivtsi, Tarnopol Voivodeship, Second Polish Republic (today Ternopil Oblast, Ukraine)
- Died: 2 October 2021 (aged 86) Prudnik, Poland

Cycling career
- Sport: Cycling
- Disciplines: Road; Cyclo-cross
- Role: Rider

Franciszek Surmiński (5 December 1934 – 2 October 2021) was a Polish racing cyclist, active in international competitions from 1961 to 1970. He participated in road races and cyclo-cross. He lived in Rudziczka, a village near the town of Prudnik, from which he received honorary citizenship on 28 February 2020.

== Major results ==
1960
1st Stage 5 Tour de Pologne
1961
1st Stage 3 Tour de Pologne
1963
1st Overall Tour of Małopolska
1964
1st Stages 8 & 10 Tour de Pologne
1st Stages6 & 13 Tour du Maroc
1969
1st National Cyclo-Cross Championships
1970
1st Stage 7 Tour de Pologne
