= Siemków =

- Village
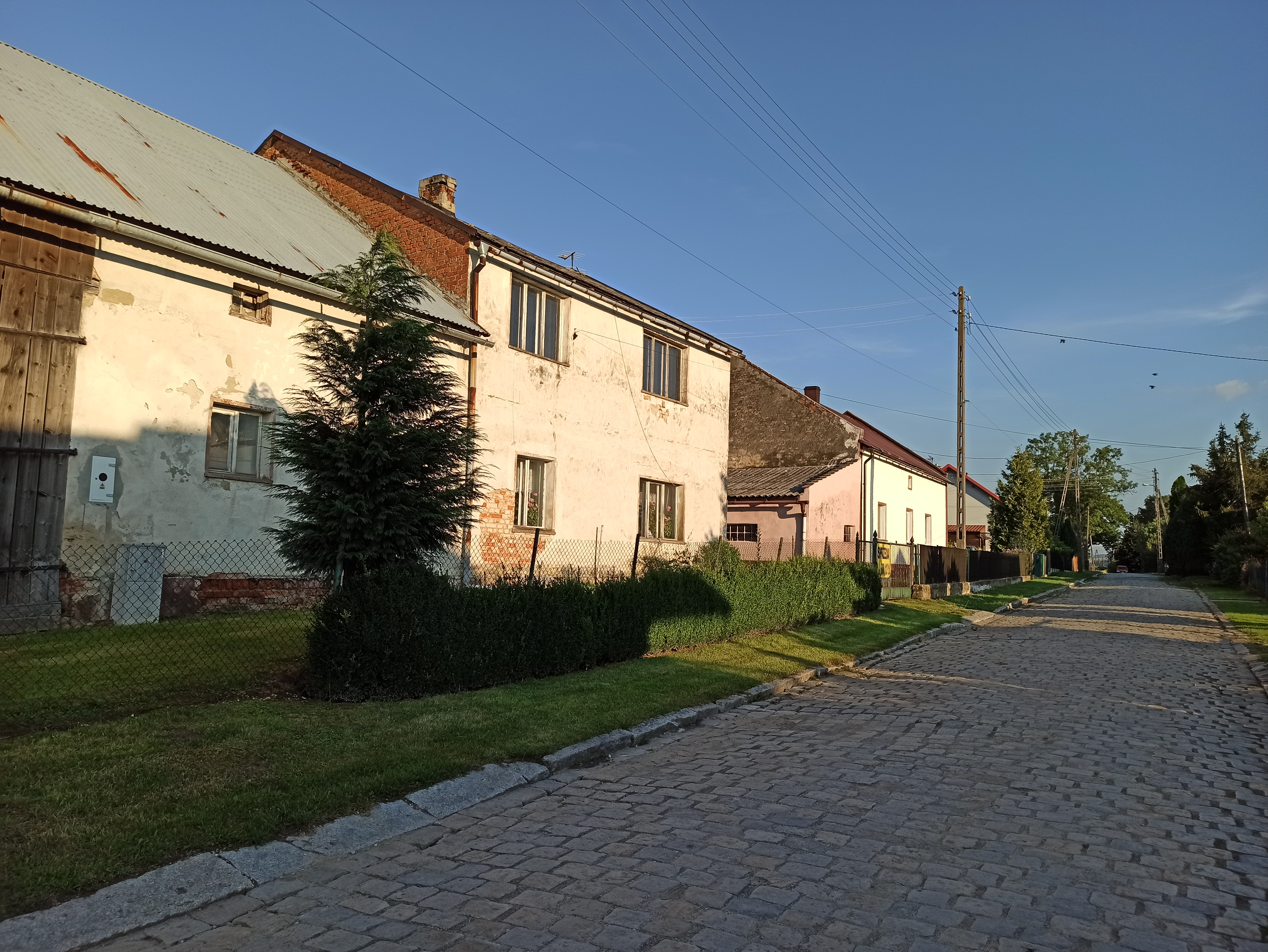

- Location within Poland
- Coordinates: 50°18′08″N 17°29′23″E
- Country: Poland
- Voivodeship: Opole
- County: Prudnik
- Gmina: Prudnik

Siemków [ɕiɛmkuv] (German: Böhmischdorf) is a village in the administrative district of Gmina Prudnik, within Prudnik County, Opole Voivodeship, in south-western Poland, close to the Czech border.

== See also ==
- Prudnik Land
