= Moszczanka, Opole Voivodeship =

Moszczanka
- Village
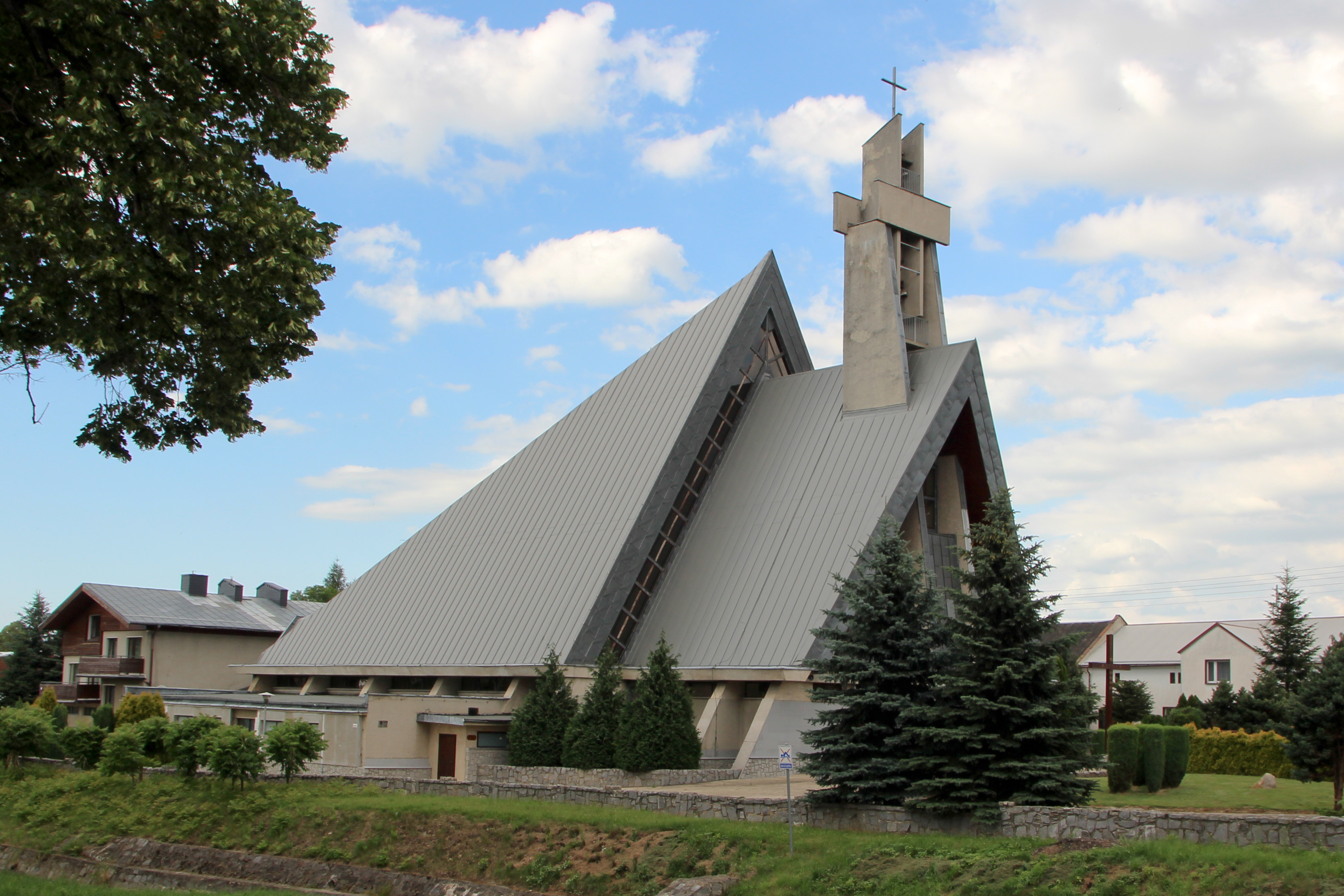
- Church in Moszczanka

- Location within Poland
- Coordinates: 50°18′3″N 17°29′28″E
- Country: Poland
- Voivodeship: Opole
- County: Prudnik
- Gmina: Prudnik
- Founded: 13th century
- First mentioned: 1321
- Highest elevation: 350 m (1,150 ft)
- Lowest elevation: 290 m (950 ft)

Population
  - Total: 1,116
- Time zone: UTC+1 (CET)
  - Summer (DST): UTC+2 (CEST)
- Vehicle registration: OPR

Moszczanka [mɔʂˈt͡ʂanka] (German: Langenbrück) is a village in the administrative district of Gmina Prudnik, within Prudnik County, Opole Voivodeship, in southern Poland, close to the Czech border.

== Geography ==
Moszczanka is located in the historic Silesia (Upper Silesia) region at the Złoty Potok river. The village is situated on the border of Opawskie Mountains and the Silesian Lowlands.

== History ==
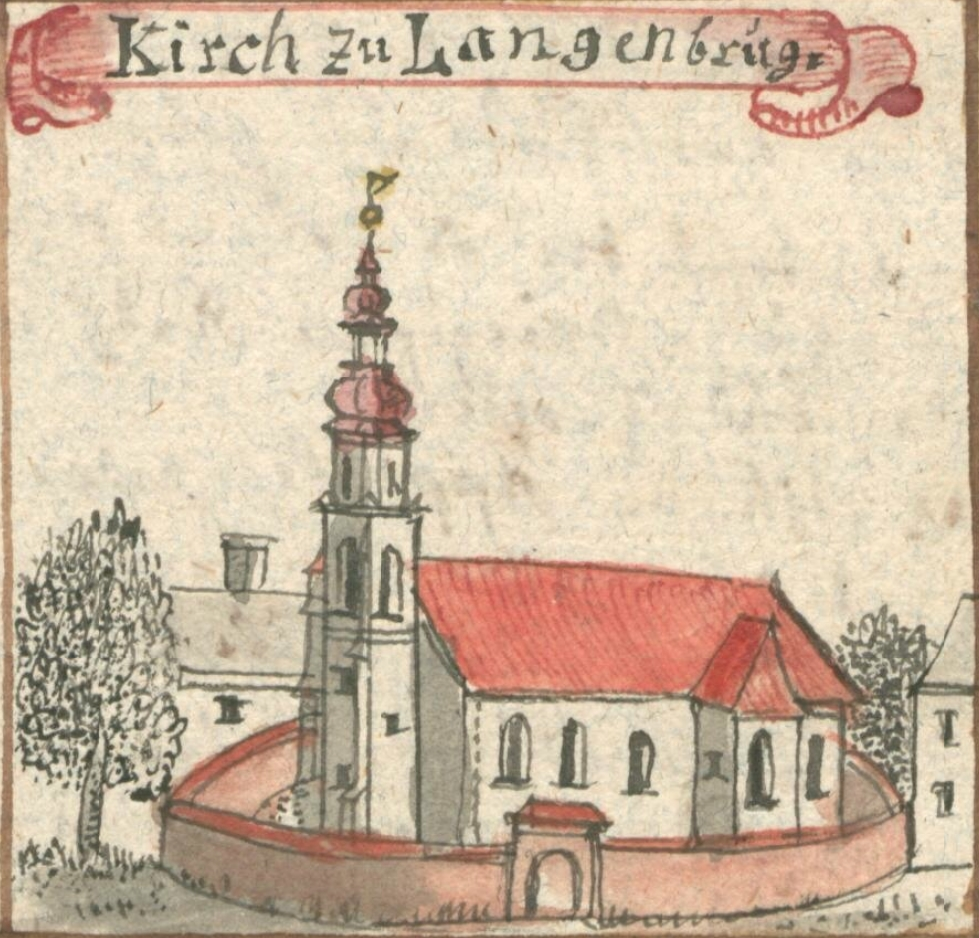
A drawing of the church in Moszczanka in the 18th century

Moszczanka was founded as a Waldhufendorf in the second half of the 13th century, when it was part of medieval Piast-ruled Poland, and settled by German colonists. The village was first mentioned in 1321. A church in the village was mentioned for the first time in 1331. In 1390 it was mentioned as Longus Pons.

During the First Silesian War, the Prussian King Frederick the Great stayed briefly in Moszczanka. After the First Silesian War in 1742, Moszczanka along with most of Silesia was taken over by Kingdom of Prussia.

After the reorganization of the province of Silesia, the rural community of Moszczanka belonged to the Landkreis Neustadt O.S. from 1816 onwards, in the Regierungsbezirk Oppeln. According to Johann Georg Knie, in 1845 there was a hereditary village administrator, a Catholic parish church, a Catholic school, six bleachers, four watermills, six looms, a wool spinning mill and 297 houses in the village. In the same year, 1819 people lived in Moszczanka, 209 of them being Protestants. In 1855, 1,707 people lived in Moszczanka. In 1865 there were 43 farmers, 64 gardeners and 174 housekeepers as well as a farm, four water mills, a cloth factory, a whitewash, five bleaching yarns, six blacksmiths, a Catholic parish church and a school. The cloth factory was one of the largest cloth factories in the area in the mid-19th century. The three-class Catholic school was attended by 389 students in 1865. In 1874 the Amtsbezirk Langenbrück was founded, which consisted of the rural communities Moszczanka and Pokrzywna and the manor districts of Moszczanka and Pokrzywna. The first head of office was the mill owner Joseph Bischoff. In 1885 Moszczanka had 2190 inhabitants.

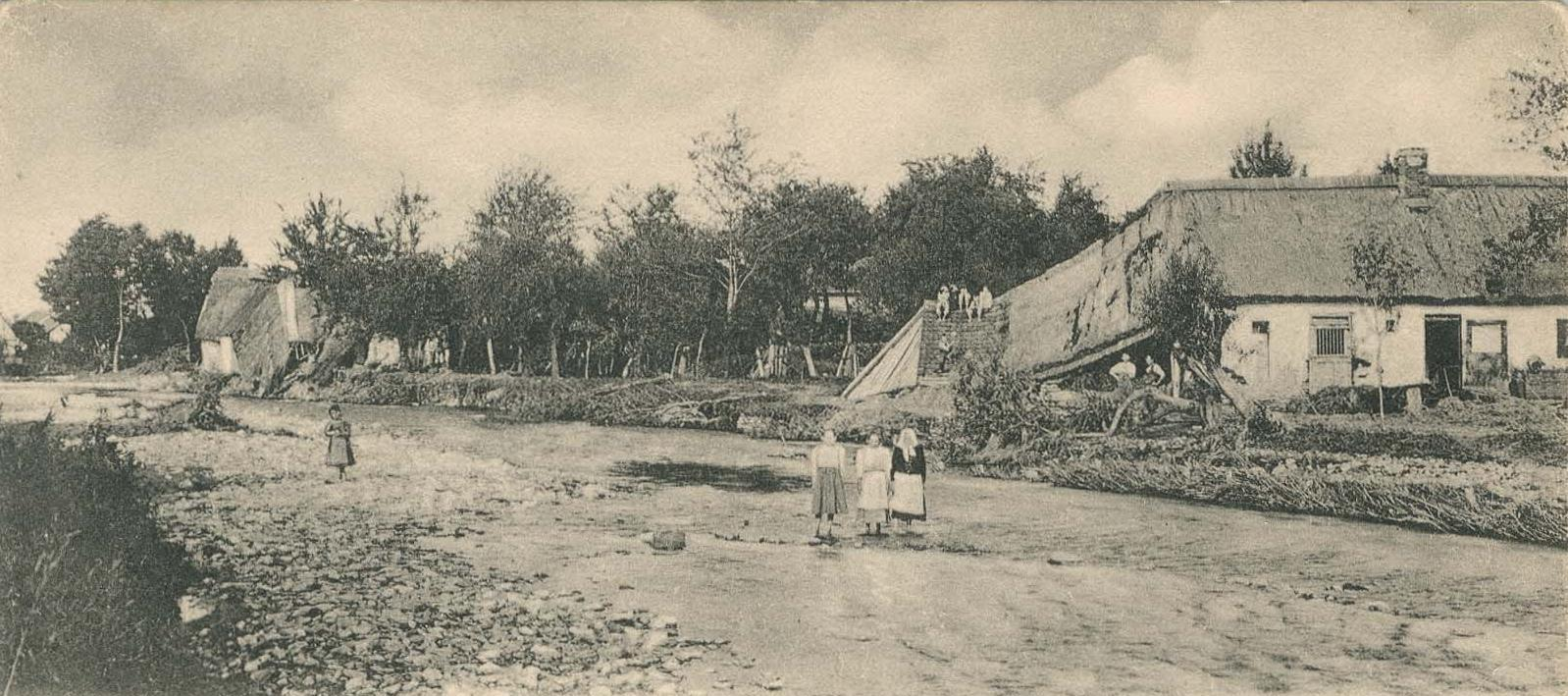
Damage after the 1903 flood

In 1903, a flood destroyed some parts of the village. In 1933 there were 1,960 people in Moszczanka and 1,897 in 1939. Until 1945 the village belonged to the Landkreis Neustadt O.S.

A Polish citizen was murdered by Nazi Germany in the village during World War II. In the evening of 17 March 1945, the residents of Moszczanka fled from the advancing Red Army. The Catholic parish church was destroyed by arson. Some of the refugees returned to Moszczanka on 9 May. In July and August 1945, Polish settlers occupied the farms in Moszczanka. After more than 50 young men were abducted by the Polish militia in October 1945, the remaining Germans who arrived in the British occupation zone a week later were expelled on 1 July 1946.

After the defeat of Germany in World War II, the village became again part of Poland and was renamed Długomosty (changed to Moszczanka in 1946). It joined the Śląsko-Dąbrowskie Voivodeship. Since 1950 the place is in Opole Voivodeship, and since 1999 it's in Prudnik County.

== Sights ==
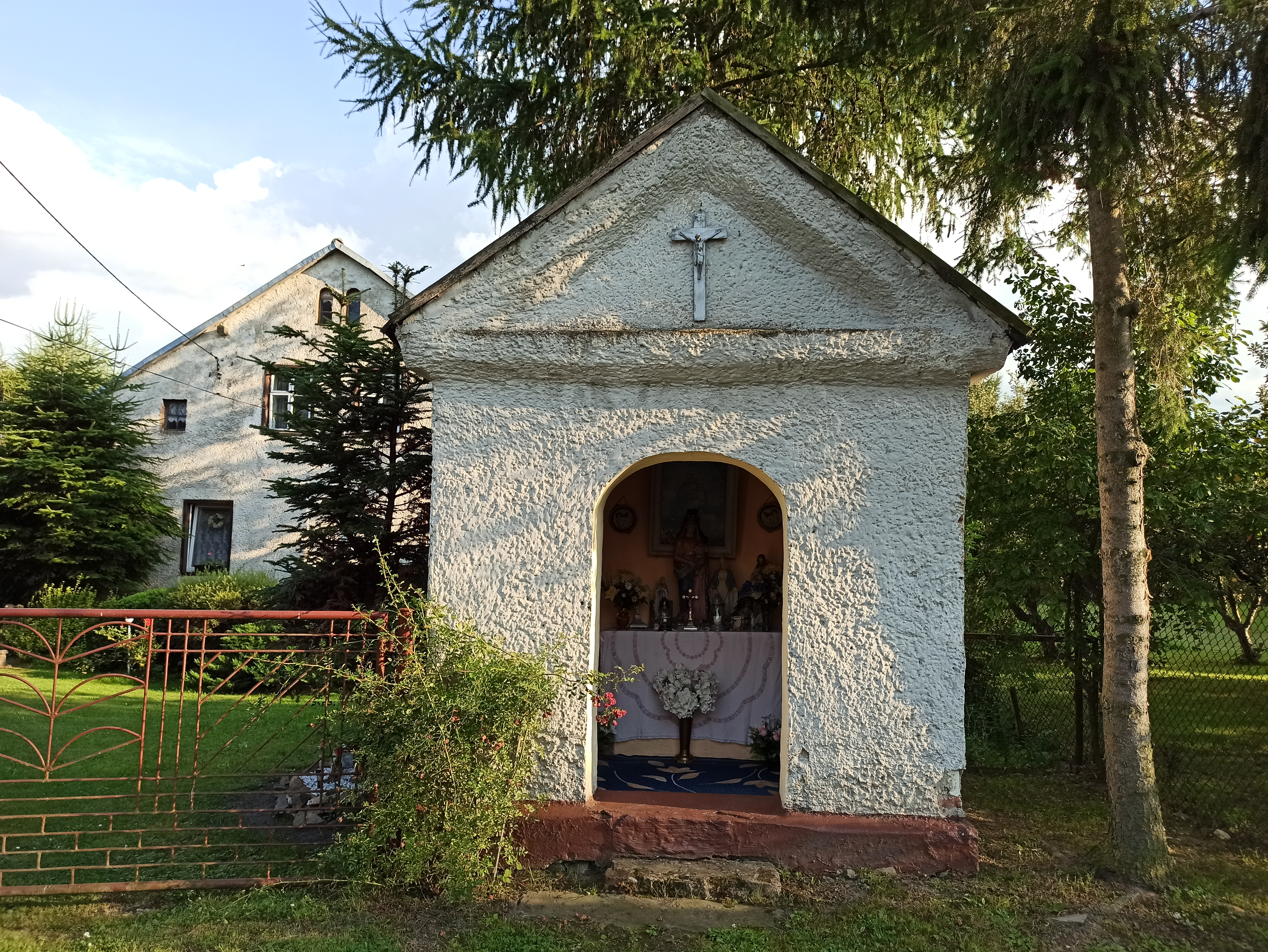
Wayside shrine

The following monuments are listed by the Narodowy Instytut Dziedzictwa.

- wayside shrine from 1827
- two 18th-19th century houses

There is also a monument from 1966 commemorating the 1000th anniversary of Poland.

== See also ==
- Prudnik Land
