= Włókna =

- Village
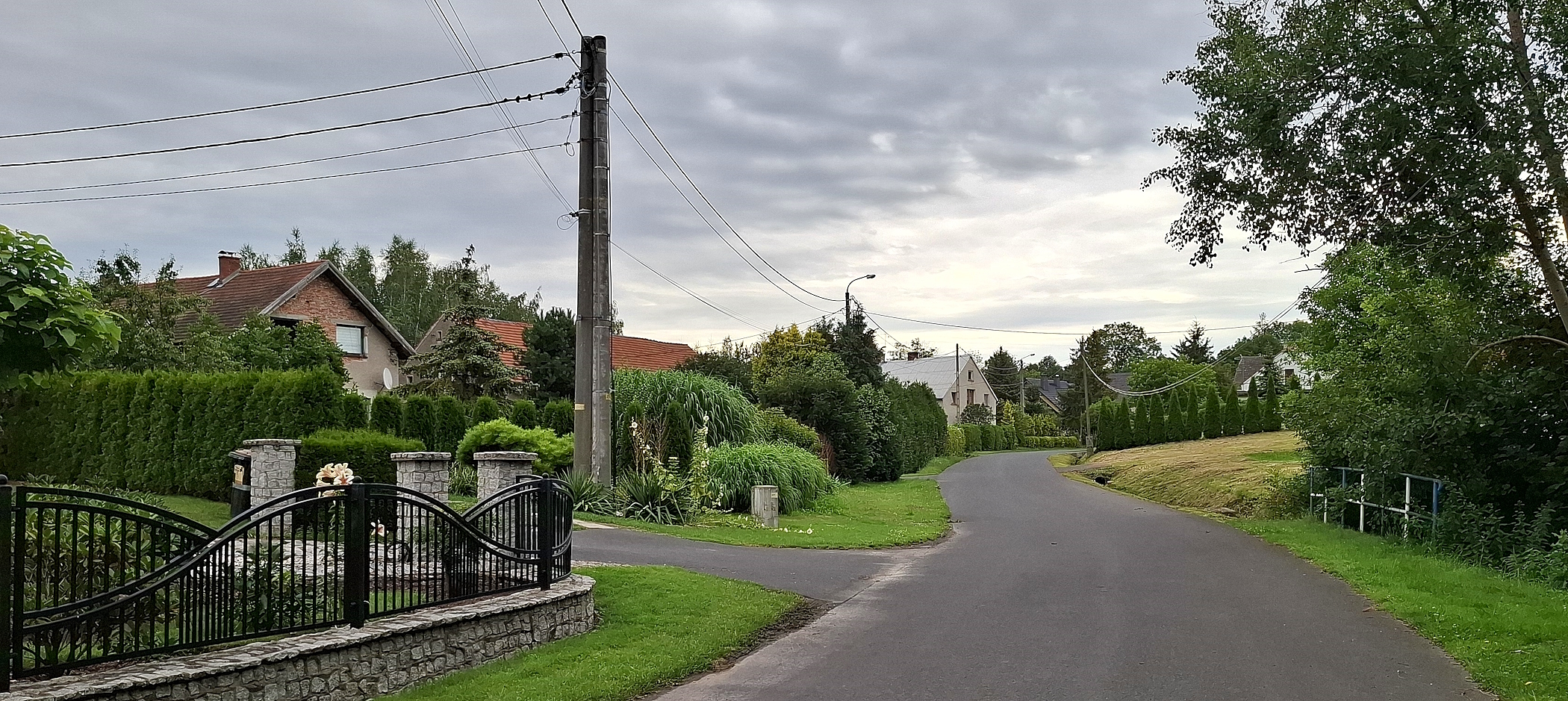

- Location within Poland
- Coordinates: 50°22′00.407″N 17°31′31.267″E
- Country: Poland
- Voivodeship: Opole
- County: Prudnik
- Gmina: Prudnik

Włókna [vvukna] (German: Siebenhuben) is a village in the administrative district of Gmina Prudnik, within Prudnik County, Opole Voivodeship, in south-western Poland, close to the Czech border.

== See also ==
- Prudnik Land
