= Wieszczyna =

- Village
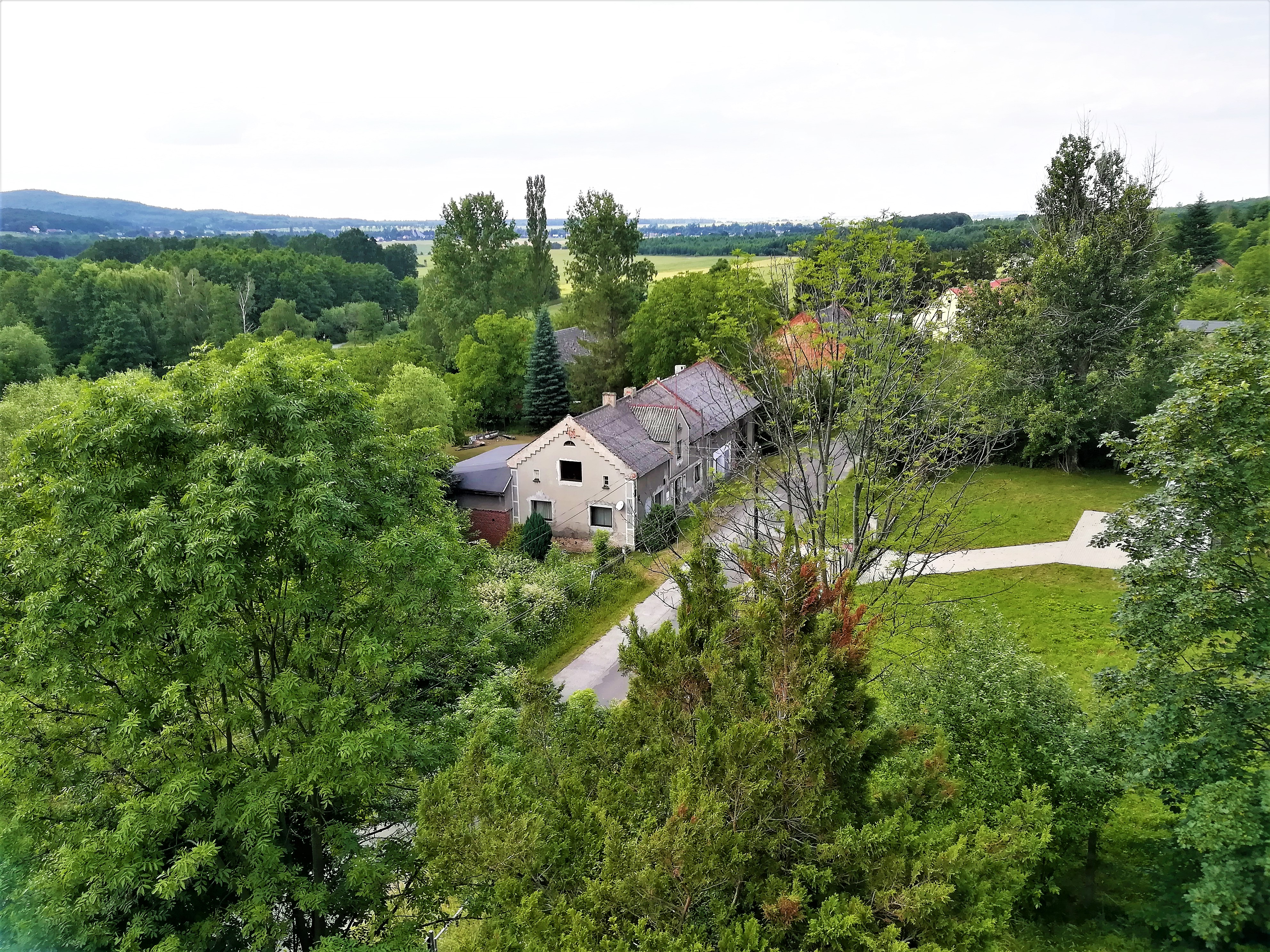
- Interactive map of Wieszczyna
- Location within Poland
- Coordinates: 50°16′54″N 17°30′35″E
- Country: Poland
- Voivodeship: Opole
- County: Prudnik
- Gmina: Prudnik
- Elevation: 330 m (1,080 ft)

Wieszczyna [vjɛʂˈt͡ʂɨna] (German: Neudeck) is a village in the administrative district of Gmina Prudnik, within Prudnik County, Opole Voivodeship, in south-western Poland, close to the Czech border.

== See also ==
- Prudnik Land
