= Szybowice =

- Village
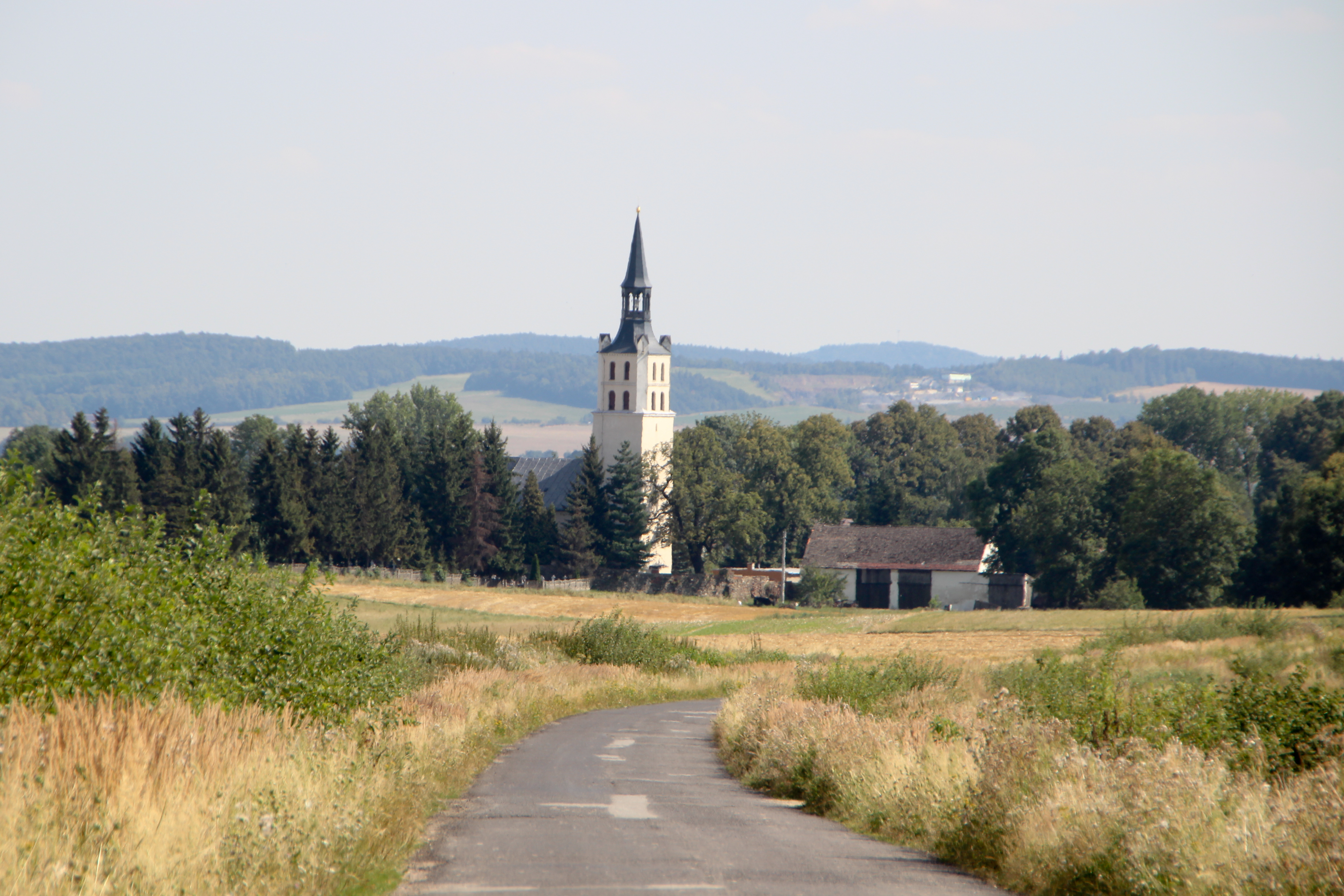

- Coat of arms

- Location within Poland
- Coordinates: 50°21′7″N 17°28′51″E
- Country: Poland
- Voivodeship: Opole
- County: Prudnik
- Gmina: Prudnik
- Highest elevation: 295 m (968 ft)
- Lowest elevation: 290 m (950 ft)
- Population: 1,064

Szybowice [ʂɨbɔˈvit͡sɛ] (German: Schnellewalde) is a village in the administrative district of Gmina Prudnik, within Prudnik County, Opole Voivodeship, in south-western Poland, close to the Czech border.

== See also ==
- Prudnik Land
