= National Institute of Cultural Heritage =

Government organization in Warsaw, Poland

- Narodowy Instytut Dziedzictwa
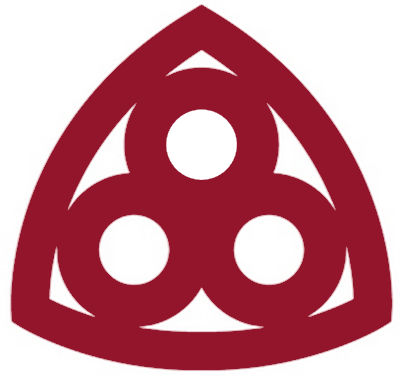

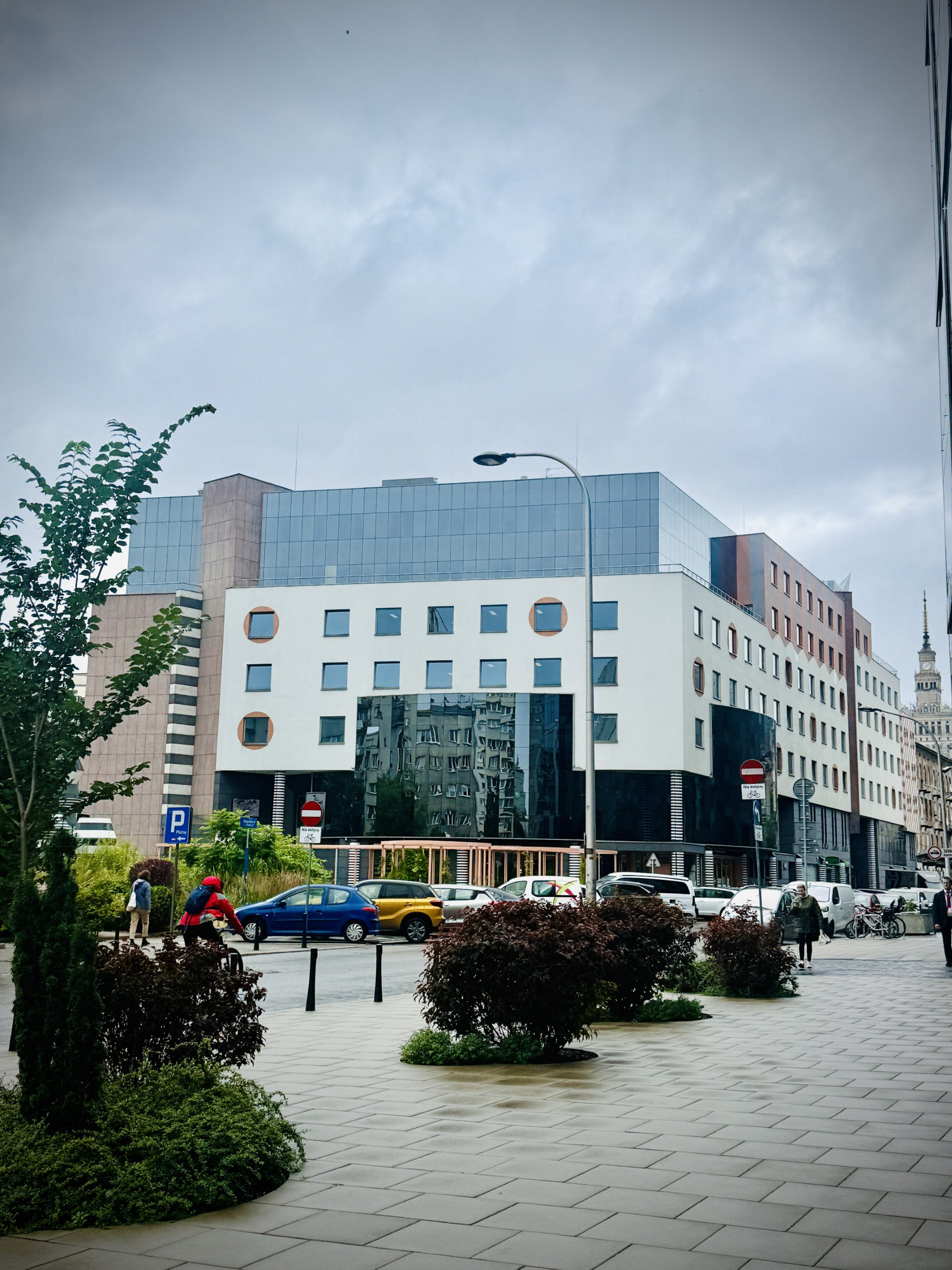
- The NID's headquarters in Wola
- Abbreviation: NID
- Headquarters: 132/134 Chmielna Street
- Location: Warsaw
- Region served: Poland
- Acting director: Michał Krasucki
- Publication: Kurier Konserwatorski
- Subsidiaries: Registry of Cultural Property
- Affiliations: EHD
- Website: nid.pl

The National Institute of Cultural Heritage of Poland (Polish: Narodowy Instytut Dziedzictwa, NID) is a Polish governmental institution responsible for documenting cultural property and the intangible cultural heritage, as well as for supporting and coordinating their protection.

== Heritage lists ==
The Institute coordinates at the national level the Registry of Cultural Property lists, maintained at the regional level by the voivodeship offices for cultural property protection (wojewódzkie urzędy ochrony zabytów) according to the Ordinance No 32 of the Ministry of Culture and National Heritage, passed on 23 December 2010. The objects protected include A) immovable sites, B) movable objects and C) archaeological monuments. These three basic types are classed into three levels of National Heritage Sites, which are firstly the List of World Heritage Sites of Poland, secondly the list of Historical Monuments, which are sites named by the Prime Minister, and thirdly, the list of cultural property.

The institute also keeps a list of national parks protected by the article paragraph 16 of the Act on the protection and care of cultural property dated 23 July 2003.

== Other activities ==
The institute organises European Heritage Days in Poland and conducts research on heritage preservation.

== See also ==
- Culture of Poland
- List of Historic Monuments in Poland
