= Waldhufendorf =

Type of village

A Waldhufendorf

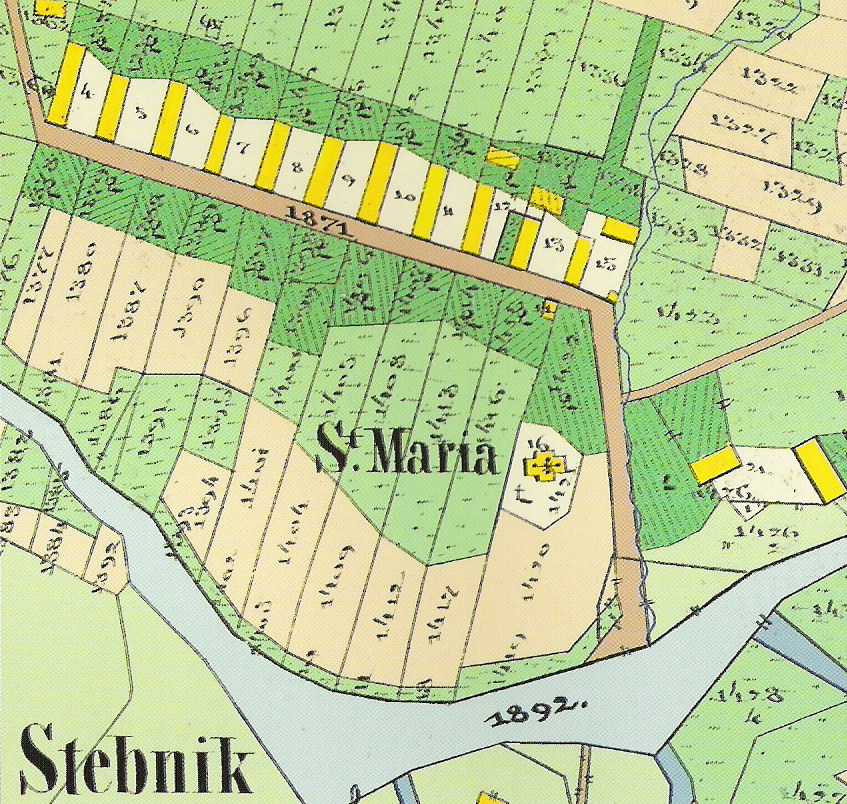
Stebnik-Steinfels (1783) was founded as a Waldhufendorf. 1852 plan

The Waldhufendorf (German pronunciation: [ˈvaltˌhuːfn̩dɔʁf], "forest village"; plural: -dörfer) is a form of rural settlement established in areas of forest clearing with the farms arranged in a series along a road or stream, like beads on a chain. It is typical of the forests of central Germany and is a type of Reihendorf, in which each farmstead usually has two wide strips of land adjacent to the farmhouse.

== History ==
This type of settlement appeared around 1000 A.D. in the hitherto unpopulated northern Black Forest in Germany. On the generally higher, fertile, rounded summits (Kuppen) of upper Bunter sandstone, the farmsteads (known as Gehöfte, Hufe or Hube) were laid out along a road through the clearing. A Frankish Hufe (Fränkische Hufe) came to mean a farm holding, 24.2 hectares (60 acres) in area. The strips of land behind the buildings ran roughly at right angles to the axis of the village up to the forest remaining on the crest of the ridge. These structures are still recognisable today.

In the 12th and 13th centuries the Waldhufendorf also became the type of village preferred by German settlers in the Thuringian, Saxon and Silesian regions. Because the plots of land were usually surrounded by a hedge (Hecke or Hag) a village in these areas was also known as a Hagenhufendorf.

Waldhufendörfer and Hagenhufendörfer are especially common in the Ore Mountains and their foreland as well as in East Saxony, the Sudeten and the Beskids, as well as the Thuringian Forest, Fichtel Mountains, Bavarian Forest, Bohemian Forest, Spessart, Odenwald, Westrich, North Black Forest and Nordvorpommern.

== Description ==
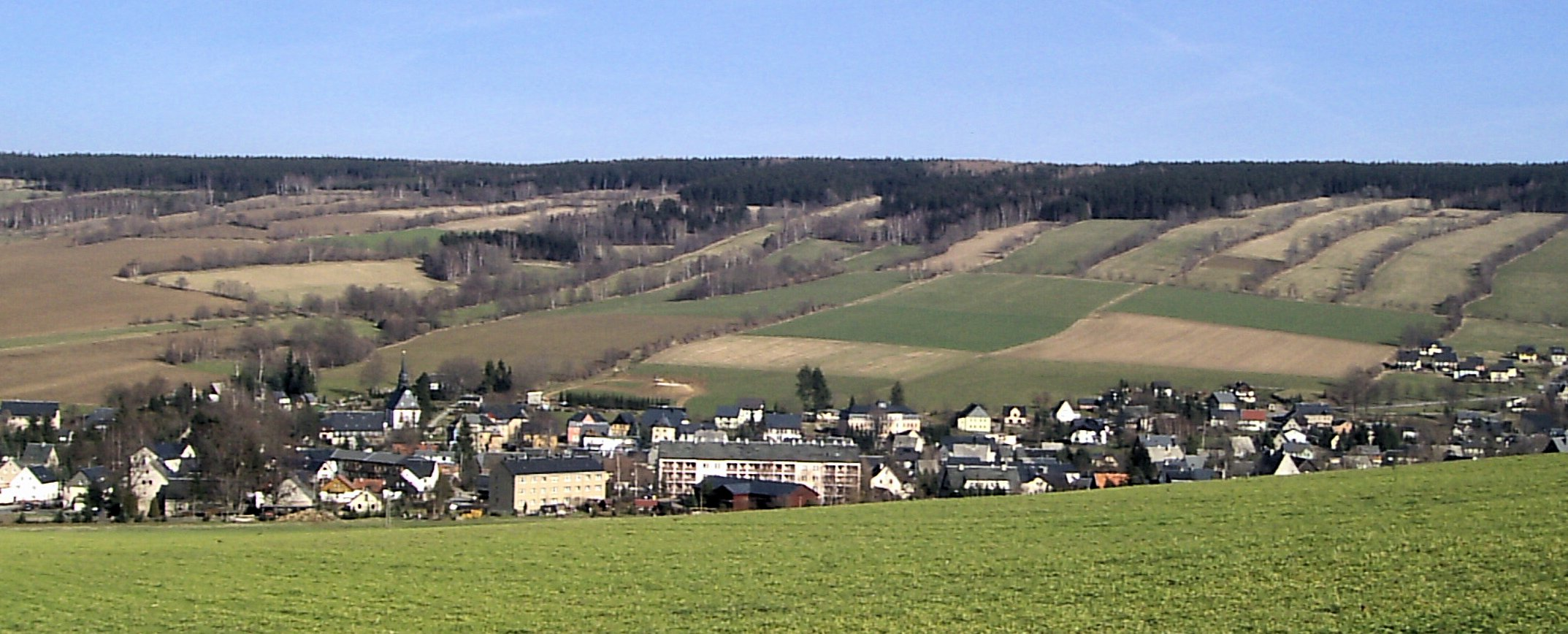
Königswalde is one of the most striking Waldhufendörfer in the Ore Mountains due to the stone ridges that have been preserved which mark the boundaries of the field strips

The main axis of the settlement is usually formed by a road, but also often by a stream, on the banks of which may be found common pasture. New settlers were given strips of land alongside tracks or roads, the size of a Hufe, which they proceeded to clear. The farmhouses were erected by a track, almost always outside the flood plain of the stream and farming was practised on the land behind them. At the far end of the Hufe was the forest or its remnants which, in the course of time, could be cleared and turned into additional fields for cultivation or farming.

Strings of Waldhufendörfer up to 25 km long occur in valleys, for example in the Saxon mountain foreland. The heart of a Waldhufendorf can also be seen in other parts of the Central Uplands in Germany. The only Waldhufendorf laid out around the church as its village centre (in principle cake-shaped) is the village of Neuweiler-Gaugenwald.

== See also ==
- Waldhufen, a place in East Saxony

== Sources ==
- Krüger, Rainer: Typologie des Waldhufendorfes nach Einzelformen und deren Verbreitungsmustern. In: Göttinger geografische Abhandlungen, Heft 42, Göttingen 1967
- Langer, Joh.: Heimatkundliche Streifzüge durch Fluren und Orte des Erzgebirges und seines Vorlandes, Schwarzenberg 1931
