= Blücher =

Blücher may refer to:

== People ==
- Blücher (surname)
- Gebhard Leberecht von Blücher (1742–1819), Prussian field marshal who led the Prussians at the Battle of Waterloo

== Arts and entertainment ==
- Blücher (film), a 1988 Norwegian film
- The Battle of Oslo, a 2025 film also titled Blücher in Norwegian
- Frau Blücher, a character in the 1974 film Young Frankenstein
- "Blücher", a song by power metal band Kamelot from their 2007 album Ghost Opera
- Blücher, a hand in the British card game Napoleon

== Military ==
- Operation Blücher, one World War I and two World War II German army operations
- Blücher Order, an East German decoration named after Field Marshal Blücher
- Wolf pack Blücher, a German U-boat pack of World War II
- List of ships named Blucher, which includes warships (as well as civilian vessels)

== Places ==
- Blucher, Saskatchewan, Canada, an unincorporated community
- Rural Municipality of Blucher No. 343, Saskatchewan
- Blücher, Germany, a former estate village of the Blücher family, now a district of Besitz
- Blucher, Newcastle, a small district of Newcastle upon Tyne, England
- Blucher Creek, California, United States

== Transport ==
- List of ships named Blucher
- Blücher (locomotive), an early railway locomotive

== Shoes ==
- Derby shoe, called a blucher in American English, whose laces tie over the tongue on two flaps
- Blucher shoe, a shoe with open lacing, similar to the derby, but with vamp in one piece

== Other uses ==
- Blucher (horse) (died 1841), a British Thoroughbred racehorse
- Blücher, a boarding house at Wellington College, Berkshire, England
- Blücher, a manufacturer of stainless steel drainage systems

== See also ==
- Blüchern, a gambling game that Field Marshal Blücher was said to have played
- Blutcher
