= Blutcher =

Blutcher may refer to:

- Blücher (locomotive), also spelled "Blutcher", an early locomotive at Killingworth Colliery
- Blucher shoe (blutchers), a style of shoe with open lacings

== People ==
- David Blutcher, 1977 winner of the 4 × 400 meter relay at the NCAA Division I Indoor Track and Field Championships
- Dimitre Blutcher, American featured in the 2012 U.S. AIDS documentary Deepsouth
- Ernestine Blütcher, wife of Frederick Delger (1822–1898), German-American businessman

== Other uses ==
- Blutcher Valley Hops, exclusive supplier to Moonlight Brewing Company, Santa Rosa, California, USA
  - Blutcher Valley, the valley of Blucher Creek, California, USA
- Blutchers Reef, Adelaide Lead, Victoria, Australia

== See also ==
- Blücher (disambiguation)
