= Blacher =

Blacher is a surname. Notable people with the surname include:

- Boris Blacher (1903–1975), German composer
- Borislav Blacher, birth name of Boryslav Bereza, Ukrainian politician
- Kolja Blacher (born 1963), German violinist, son of Boris Blacher
- Sarah Blacher Cohen (1936–2008), writer and scholar
- Tatjana Blacher (born 1956), German actress; daughter of Boris Blacher

== See also ==
- Blücher (surname)
