= Weigelt =

Weigelt is a surname. Notable people with the surname include:

- Benjamin Weigelt (born 1982), German footballer
- Henri Weigelt (born 1998), German footballer
- Horst Weigelt (born 1934), German Protestant theologian
- Johannes Weigelt (born 1890), German palaeontologist and geologist
- Liane Buhr (née Weigelt, born 1956), German rowing coxswain

== See also ==
- Weigel
