= Sośnica, Lower Silesian Voivodeship =

Sośnica
- Village
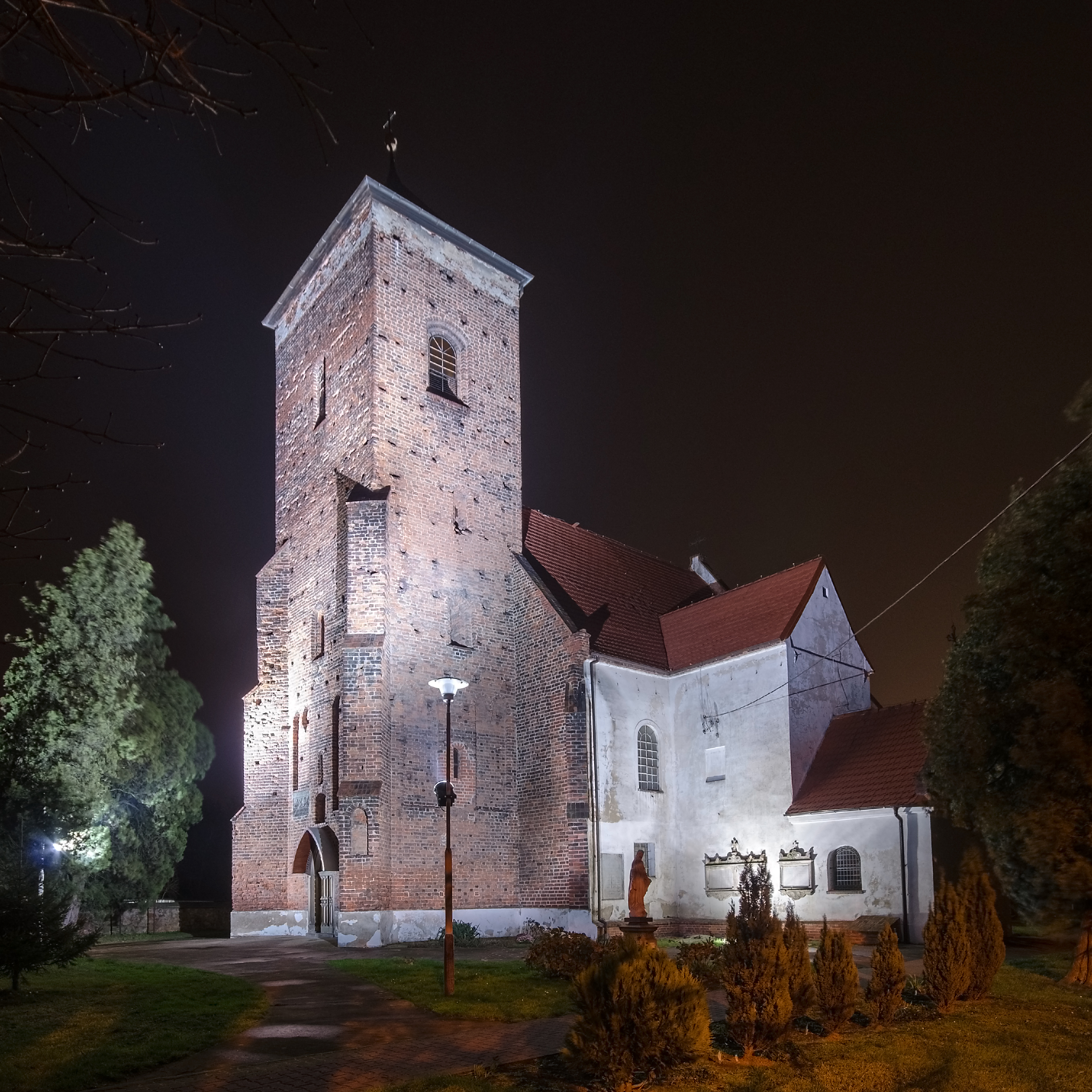
- Exaltation of the Holy Cross church

- Location within Poland
- Coordinates: 51°2′N 16°47′E
- Country: Poland
- Voivodeship: Lower Silesian
- County: Wrocław
- Gmina: Kąty Wrocławskie

Sośnica [sɔɕˈnit͡sa] is a village in the administrative district of Gmina Kąty Wrocławskie, within Wrocław County, Lower Silesian Voivodeship, in south-western Poland.

== Etymology ==
The name of the village is of Polish origin and comes from the word sosna which means "pine". It was first mentioned as Sosnic in 1244, when it was part of Piast-ruled Poland.

== Sights ==
The landmarks of Sośnica are the Sośnica Palace and the Gothic Exaltation of the Holy Cross church.

Field Marshal Gebhard Leberecht von Blücher is buried here. His remains were moved after the Cold War by a local priest from the original tomb in nearby Krobielowice, which was desecrated by Soviet soldiers in 1945.
