= Biagiotti =

Biagiotti is an Italian surname. Notable people with the surname include:

- Adriana Biagiotti (born 1947), Italian artistic gymnast
- Laura Biagiotti (1943–2017), Italian fashion designer
- Lisa Biagiotti (born 1979), filmmaker and journalist based in Los Angeles
