= List of ships named Blucher =

Several vessels have been named Blucher for Field Marshal Prince Gebhard Leberecht von Blücher, who had helped defeat Napoleon at the Battle of Leipzig and Battle of Waterloo in 1813.

- Little Catherine (1801 ship) was launched in 1801 at Bermuda and entered British registry in 1809. At that time she traded between Liverpool and Africa. In 1813 she became a temporary packet sailing for the Post Office Packet Service from Falmouth, Cornwall. In 1813 the French Navy captured her and abandoned her after taking off her crew. The Royal Navy recovered her three days later. In 1814 an American privateer captured her but the Royal Navy recaptured her within two weeks. The Government Post Office purchased her to return her to use as a Falmouth packet but renamed her Blucher. The government sold Blucher in 1823. New owners returned her to the name Little Catherine and she continued to sail widely until she was last listed in 1845, having been sold to a Chinese owner. Her crew mutinied and wrecked her in October 1847.
- Blucher was a vessel of American origin and of 102 tons (bm) that in 1814 sailed from London to Malta. In 1816 she sailed from Malta for the Ionian Islands during a thunderstorm and was never heard from again.
- Blucher (1814 ship) was launched at Boston in 1809 under another name. The British captured her around 1814 and new owners renamed her. She traded with India and South East Asia under a license from the British East India Company until she wrecked in 1818.
- Blucher (1814 Sunderland ship) was launched in 1814 at Sunderland. She mostly sailed across the Atlantic to South and North America though she may have made a voyage to Calcutta under a license from the British East India Company (EIC). She was wrecked in 1824.
- Blücher was a Barbarossa-class ocean liner built in 1902 and scrapped in 1929.

== Naval vessels ==
- SMS Blücher (1877) was a Bismarck-class corvette built for the German Kaiserliche Marine (Imperial Navy). In 1907 she suffered a boiler explosion that badly damaged the ship and killed thirty men. Deemed too old to warrant repairing, Blücher was instead sold to a Dutch company that used her as a coal storage hulk; her ultimate fate is unknown.
- SMS Blücher – German armored cruiser lost at the Battle of Dogger Bank (1915)
- The German cruiser Blücher was an Admiral Hipper-class heavy cruiser of Nazi Germany's Kriegsmarine. Norwegian coastal defences in the Oslofjord sank her on 9 April 1940 during the German invasion of Norway.

== See also ==
- Prince Blucher (1815 ship) was launched at Chittagong. She made one voyage for the British East India Company. She participated in two and possibly three rescues, one particularly notable, and was wrecked in 1821. Condemned, she was laid up and later broken up in 1824.
