= Josef Joachim Menzel =

German historian (1933–2020)

Josef Joachim Menzel (born 19 June 1933 in Miłowice, Opole Voivodeship, died 29 August 2020 in Mainz) was a German historian.

He was born on June 19, 1933, in Mühlsdorf near Neustadt, Germany (nowadays Miłowice, Opole Voivodeship, Poland). After 1945 he lived with his family in Münsterland. He graduated from high school in Recklinghausen, then he studied history, classical philology and German at the University of Münster and Heidelberg University. Later Menzel worked at the Institut für Österreichische Geschichtsforschung. He obtained his PhD in 1962.

In 1966 he moved to Mainz, where he worked as an assistant of Ludwig Petry. He passed his habilitation in 1970. The topic of his habilitation thesis was Die schlesischen Lokationsurkunden des 13. Jahrhunderts. He became an adjunct professor in 1972 and university professor in 1978. Menzel taught medieval history and historical auxiliary sciences at the University of Mainz until 1998.

The spectrum of his research included the history of the Merovingians, the Hanseatic League, the emergence of the Swiss Confederation and history of Silesia. He was editor or co-editor of Schlesischen Urkundenbuches, the three-volume Geschichte Schlesiens, Schlesischen Lebensbilder and the Jahrbuchs der Schlesischen Friedrich-Wilhelms-Universität zu Breslau.

He died on August 29, 2020, in Mainz.

== Publications ==
- Jura ducalia. Die mittelalterlichen Grundlagen der Dominialverfassung in Schlesien. Würzburg 1964, OCLC 1072396189.
- Die schlesischen Lokationsurkunden des 13. Jahrhunderts. Studien zum Urkundenwesen, zur Siedlungs-, Rechts- und Wirtschaftsgeschichte einer ostdeutschen Landschaft im Mittelalter. Würzburg 1977, OCLC 4373262.
- with Wolfgang Stribrny and Eberhard Völker: Alternativ-Empfehlungen zur Behandlung der deutsch-polnischen Geschichte in den Schulbüchern. Mainz 1979, ISBN 3-7758-0973-2.
- co-editor with Lothar Bossle, Gundolf Keil and Eberhard Günter Schulz: Schlesien als Gegenstand interdisziplinärer Forschung. Sigmaringen 1986 (= Schlesische Forschungen. Band 1).
- Der Aufbruch Europas nach Osten im Mittelalter. Abschiedsvorlesung gehalten am 7. Juli 1998 im Philosophicum der Johannes-Gutenberg-Universität zu Mainz. Mainz 1998, ISBN 3-00-004012-9.

== Bibliography ==
- Traueranzeigen von Josef Joachim Menzel
- Karsten Eichner: Menzel, Josef Joachim. In: Kulturportal West-Ost.
