= Anton Felix von Blücher =

Prussian-American engineer, interpreter and surveyor (1819–1879)

- Born: Anton Felix Hans Hellmuth von Blücher; November 15, 1819; Prussia
- Died: February 6, 1879 (aged 59); Cameron County, Texas, US
- Other name: Felix A. von Blücher
- Occupations: Military engineer, civil engineer, interpreter, surveyor
- Spouse: Maria Augusta Imme von Blücher
- Relatives: Gebhard Leberecht von Blücher (great uncle)

Anton Felix Hans Hellmuth von Blücher (November 15, 1819 – February 6, 1879) was an Prussian-born American interpreter, civil and military engineer, and surveyor.

== Early life and education ==
Von Blücher was born on Novembet 15, 1819, in Prussia. His great uncle was military officer Gebhard Leberecht von Blücher. He received military training while in Prussia. He studied at the Humboldt University of Berlin, studying civil engineering, law, and languages and graduating with a Master of Arts. He lived in Berlin for a time.

== Career ==
In 1844, von Blücher moved to New Orleans, working as a shipyard drafter there. He later changed his name to Felix A. von Blücher. In 1845, he and Prince Carl of Solms-Braunfels traveled to Texas, where he worked as an engineer and interpreter. He interpreted for John O. Meusebach while he treatied with the Comanche. In 1847, he was an interpreter for Winfield Scott in the Mexican–American War.

Von Blücher visited Germany, and in 1849, moved to Corpus Christi. He surveyed school sites for Nueces County and was a City Councilman. In 1853, he surveyed a road conntecting Corpus Christi and Eagle Pass. During the American Civil War, he was an officer of military engineering and artilleries, helping defend during the Battle of Corpus Christi. He afterwards a military engineer in Mexico. After the war, he became a lawyer, and in 1873, became a consulting engineer for the Corpus Christi and Rio Grande Railroad Company. In 1875, he was named deputy surveryor of Zapata County, as which he resurveryed land grants created during the era of Spanish Texas.

== Personal life and death ==
Von Blücher was married to educator Maria Augusta Imme von Blücher, with whom he had five children. He died on February 6, 1879, aged 59, at Tresquilas Ranch in Cameron County, Texas.
