= Horst Weigelt =

German Protestant theologian and professor (1934–2024)

Horst Weigelt (1934 – August 2024) was a German Protestant theologian. From 1975 to 2002 he was Professor of Historical and Systematic Theology at the Otto Friedrich University of Bamberg. His research focuses on the Reformation, Pietism and Enlightenment in the early modern period. He also wrote specifically on Schwenkfelders.

== Biography ==
Weigelt was born in Liegnitz in 1934. After studying Protestant theology for four years at the University of Erlangen and the University of Tübingen, he passed the first theological examination in 1958 and the second in 1960. The following year he received his doctorate in Erlangen. In 1962 he was ordained in the Evangelical Lutheran Church in Bavaria.

From 1969, Weigelt worked as a private lecturer. Beginning in 1974, he lectured at the Friedrich-Alexander University in Erlangen-Nuremberg. In 1975 he received the chair for historical and systematic theology at the Otto Friedrich University in Bamberg and was also lecturer in Bavarian church history at the Friedrich Alexander University in Erlangen-Nuremberg. He retired in 2002.

Weigelt died in August 2024.

== Works ==
- Pietismus-Studien. 1. Teil: Der spener-hallische Pietismus (Arbeiten zur Theologie II/4), Stuttgart 1965
- Johann Kaspar Lavater. Leben, Werk und Wirkung Göttingen 1991
- (editor with Dietrich Meyer, Gustav Adolf Benrath, Ulrich Hutter-Wolandt and Ludwig Petry: Zur Geschichte der evangelischen Kirche in Schlesien München 1992
- The Schwenckfelders in Silesia (Pennsburg 1995)
- Johann Kaspar Lavater Reisetagebücher. Vol. 1. Tagebuch von der Studien- und Bildungsreise nach Deutschland 1763 und 1764 Göttingen 1997
- Johann Kaspar Lavater Reisetagebücher. Vol. 2. Reisetagebuch nach Süddeutschland 1778 Reisetagebuch in die Westschweiz 1785 Brieftagebuch von der Reise nach Kopenhagen 1793 Göttingen 1997 ISBN 9783525558614
- Von Schwenckfeld bis Löhe: Aspekte aus der Geschichte evangelischer Theologie und Frömmigkeit in Bayern Neustadt an der Aisch, 1999
- Geschichte des Pietismus in Bayern Göttingen, 2001 ISBN 9783525558249
- Johannes Schwanhauser: Schriften und Predigten Neustadt an der Aisch 2010
- Migration and Faith: The Migrations of the Schwenkfelders from Germany to America, Risks and Opportunities (Göttingen Vandenhoeck & Ruprecht, 2017) ISBN 9783647564357
