= Krobielowice =

- Village
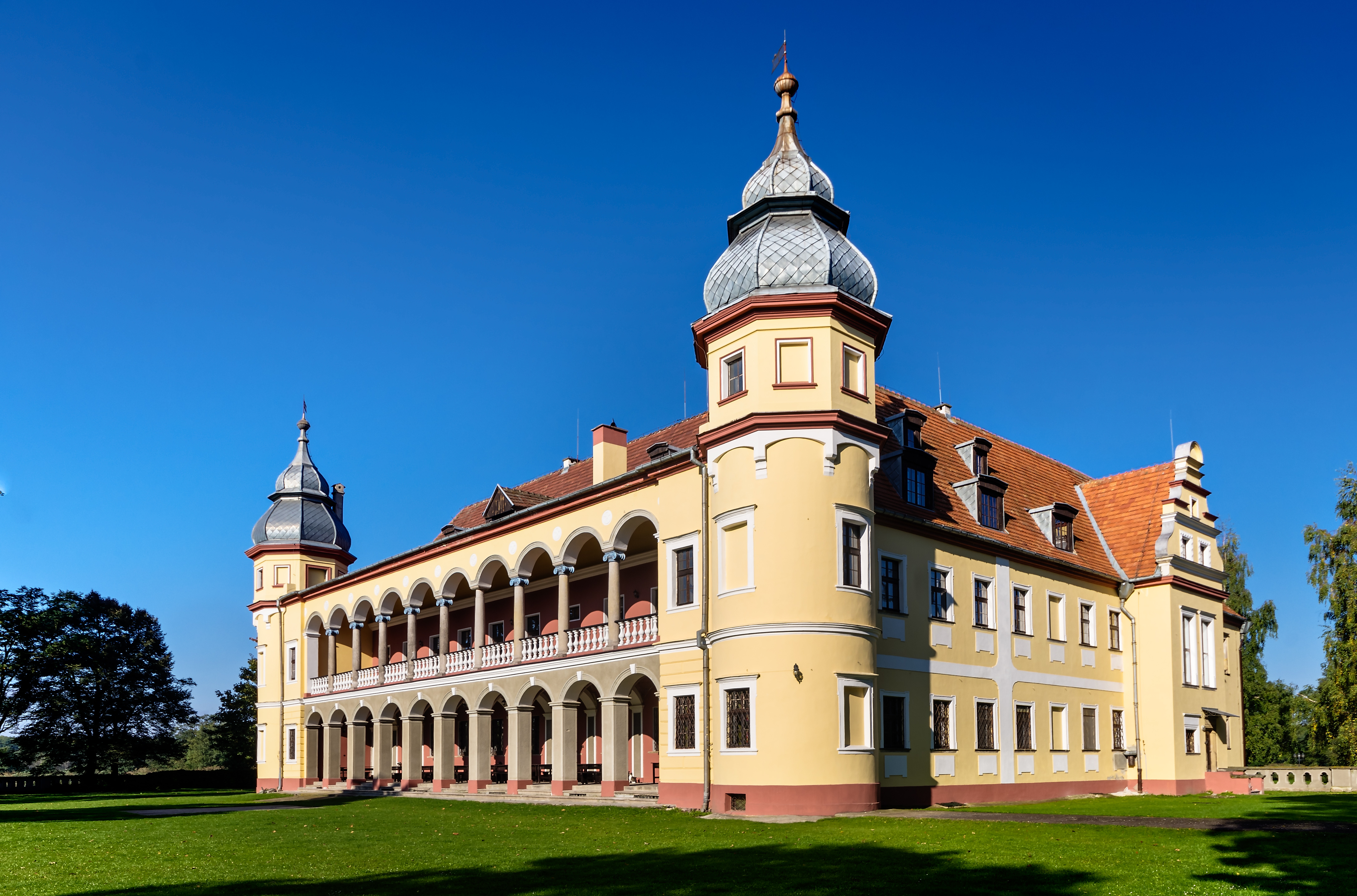
- Krobielowice Palace

- Location within Poland
- Coordinates: 51°00′33″N 16°47′55″E
- Country: Poland
- Voivodeship: Lower Silesian
- County: Wrocław
- Gmina: Kąty Wrocławskie

Population
  - Total: 165
- Time zone: UTC+1 (CET)
  - Summer (DST): UTC+2 (CEST)
- Vehicle registration: DWR

Krobielowice [krɔbjɛlɔˈvit͡sɛ] is a village in the administrative district of Gmina Kąty Wrocławskie, within Wrocław County, Lower Silesian Voivodeship, in south-western Poland.

== History ==
The oldest known written mention of the village comes from 1321, when ruled by the Polish Piast dynasty. A fortified manor was erected in the 14th century, which was eventually expanded into a palace in the following centuries. Later on, it passed to Bohemia, Hungary, Austria and Prussia. In 1814, the village of Krieblowitz, administratively located in the Province of Silesia, was granted by the King Frederick William III of Prussia to Field Marshal Gebhard Leberecht von Blücher as a reward for his achievements in the Napoleonic Wars. He died here in 1819. It was incorporated into the new German Empire in 1871. From 1937 to 1945 under the Nazis Krieblowitz was renamed Blüchersruh ("Blücher's resting place"), partly to honour the Field Marshal, and partly to erase traces of Polish origin.

The town remained part of Germany until the end of the Second World War. Blücher's mausoleum was vandalized by Soviet troops in 1945. The area was transferred to Poland later that same year. Blücher's empty tomb remains.

In 1990s, the palace was renovated. It houses now a hotel and a restaurant. The area around the hotel was turned into a golf course.

== People ==
- Gebhard Leberecht von Blücher (1742-1819), Prussian fieldmarshal, died in Krieblowitz
