= Blüchern =

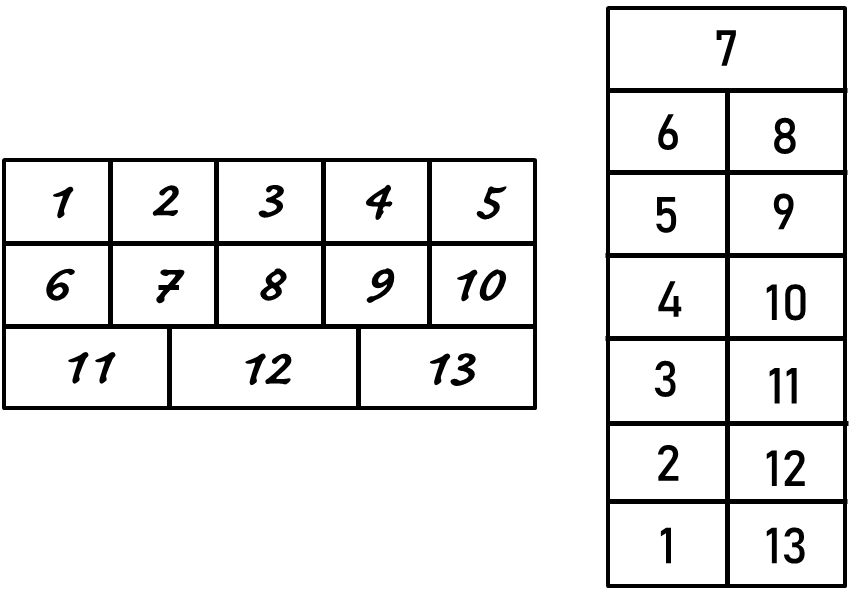
Two possible betting board layouts

Blüchern is a simple gambling card game for any number of players that is played either with a pack of 52 French playing cards or with a pack of 32 French or German playing cards.

== History ==
As a game of chance, Blüchern is only of historical significance; today it is played as a social game. It was named after the Prussian General Field Marshal, Gebhard Leberecht von Blücher, who is supposed to have liked playing it.

== Playing ==
The game is played by any number of players against a bank. In the centre is a betting board, on which the numbers 1 to 13 are marked and on which the players place their stakes.

The banker shuffles the pack and allows a player to cut it. He then places the cards down as a talon. All the players place their bets on the corresponding fields of the betting board. After all players have laid their bets, the banker draws 13 cards, one after another, from the talon, counting aloud and turning them face up. Each time the value of the draw card matches the announced number, he takes all the placed bets from the corresponding field on the board as winnings for the bank. When all 13 cards have been faced, if no cards matched the announced number, the banker doubles all the stakes and the players may now claim their winnings, stick or re-bet. The game ends after four rounds when the talon has been exhausted.

== Literature ==
- Gööck, Roland (1967). Freude am Kartenspiel. Bertelsmann, Gütersloh.
- Grupp, Claus D. (1975). "Blüchern". Kartenspiele. Wiesbaden: Falken-Verlag Erich Sicker. ISBN 3-8068-2001-5., pp. 12–13.
- Kastner, Hugo; Folkvord, Gerald Kador (2005). Die große Humboldt-Enzyklopädie der Kartenspiele. Humboldt, Baden-Baden: Humboldt-Taschenbuch 4058. ISBN 978-3-89994-058-9..
- Müller, Reiner F. (1994). Die bekanntesten Kartenspiele. Berlin: Neff. ISBN 3-8118-5856-4.
- Reichelt, Hans (1987). Kartenspiele von Baccara bis Whist. Wiesbaden: Englisch. ISBN 3-88140-313-2.
- von Alvensleben, L. (1853). Encyclopädie der Spiele. Leipzig: Otto Wigand.
