= Blücher Order =

Blücher Order Blücher Orden
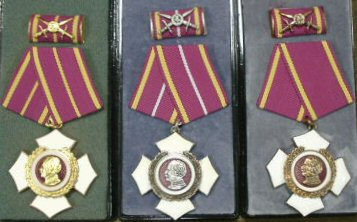
- Crosses of the Order
- Type: Order
- Awarded for: Valor in time of war
- Country: East Germany
- Status: defunct; never awarded
- Established: 1965
- Ribbon bars: Gold, silver and bronze cross Gold, silver and bronze medal
- Related: Blücher Medal

The Blücher Order (German: Blücher-Orden) was an order of the German Democratic Republic (GDR). It was named after the Prussian Generalfeldmarschall Gebhard Leberecht von Blücher. He was seen as a hero in the GDR for his part in defeating the invading army of Napoleon Bonaparte.

== History ==
The decoration was created in 1965 by the Chairman of the Council of State Walter Ulbricht. It was supposed to be awarded to NVA soldiers as a valor award in a time of war. The decoration was never awarded as the GDR was never in a state of war. However on 25 January 1985, the National Defence Council ordered that 8,000 were to be minted immediately. The decoration came in six classes: the medal grade, which was divided into three classes (bronze, silver and gold), and the cross grade, which was divided into three classes in the same way.

Some of the remaining Blücher Orders are now on display in the Military History Museum of the Bundeswehr. An example of the bronze medal is also on display at the Canadian War Museum.

== Design ==
The cross was shaped as a white cross; in its center there was a portrait of Gebhard Leberecht von Blücher surrounded by a wreath of oak leaves (its color was according to the class of the award). The cross was attached to a red ribbon with two yellow stripes on its edges. The silver class has a silver strip in the center and the gold class had a gold strip.

The medal was round and featured a depiction of the front of the cross on it. Its ribbon was yellow with blue stripes down its center according to the medal class.

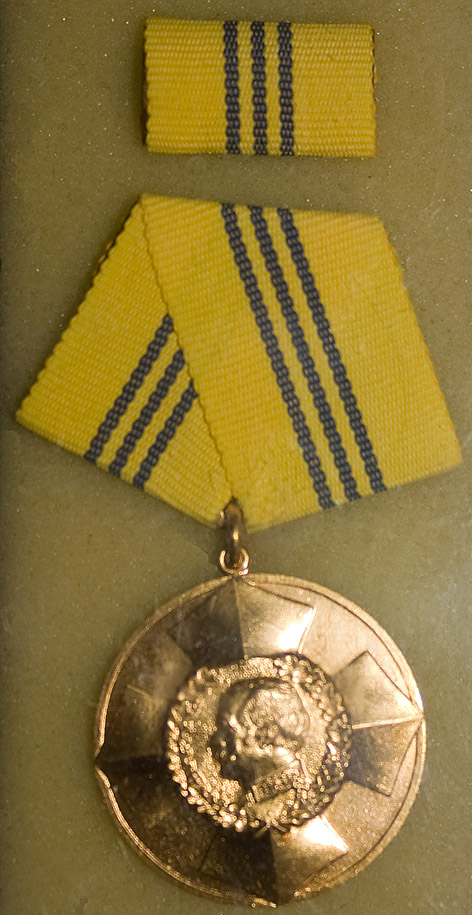
Gold Medal of the Blücher-Orden
