= Moonlight Brewing Company =

Coordinates: 38°28′18.02″N 122°44′47.64″W

- Industry: Alcoholic beverage
- Founded: 1992
- Headquarters: Santa Rosa, California, USA
- Products: Beer
- Production output: 2700 barrels
- Owner: Brian Hunt
- Website: http://www.moonlightbrewing.com/

The Moonlight Brewing Company is a brewery founded in 1992 by Brian Hunt in Santa Rosa, California, USA. It is best known for its flagship beers, Death & Taxes Black Beer and Reality Czeck-style Pilsner, which are popular in Sonoma County, California. In 2008, it received the Best Brewery award at the 17th annual Santa Rosa Beerfest.

== History ==
Founder, brewmaster and abbot Brian Hunt started the brewing company in 1992, not for profit but to "support his habit". With a degree in Fermentation Science from UC Davis, and years experience as a brewmaster and beer consultant, Hunt saw the brewery as a chance to become self-employed. At the age of 35, he rented an 1,000-square-foot (93 m^{2}) tractor barn near Windsor, California and bought 200 used beer kegs. In 2003 the brewery was moved to a building built specifically for the purpose of brewing beer and was designated the Abbey de St Humulus through the Universal Life Church. Moonlight Brewing cultivated a large field of hops for its seasonal Homegrown Wet Hop Ale on the old property. In 2018, Moonlight opened an enlarged and comfortable taproom onsite with limited retail sales. Currently Moonlight Brewing Company resides in a business park in northwest Santa Rosa. In 2016 half the brewery was sold to Lagunitas Brewing Company. In 2019 a dedicated canning line was installed, allowing more people to enjoy the delicious beers.

== Production ==
Due to its relatively small production, 2,700 barrels in 2017, beer had been limited to kegs served almost exclusively in the San Francisco Bay Area. In 2018, Moonlight experimented with packaging their flagships Death & Taxes and Reality Czeck in 16 ounce cans. During the pandemic, all production shifted to cans, returning with kegs once demand re-emerged.

== Beer ==
Currently, the brewery produces a large variety of ales and lagers, including frequent seasonals. The three year-round production beers includes Death & Taxes (black lager), Reality Czeck (Czech-style Pilsner), and Bombay by Boat (IPA). Wee Nibble Petite Saison is brewed in Summertime. Homegrown Wet Hop Ale is brewed using hops that are solely from nearby Blutcher Valley Hops, which are harvested in mid-September. Working for Tips Redwood Ale is brewed in the Scandinavian tradition using wild harvested Coastal Redwood branch tips around late May. Boney Fingers is a seasonally-produced black lager, brewed specifically for Halloween. Toast (Slightly Burnt) Aged Lager is aged for a year and released for New Years. Other rotating specials include: Black to Reality Black Pilsner, Calcutta by Clipper Pale Ale, Serial Delusion Pale Ale, Delhi by Dinghy Double IPA, Twist of Fate Red Ale, Dim Lights Gently Smoked Lager, Paternal Instinct Lager, Wax & Wane Pale Ale, Misspent Youth Pale Ale, Tipple Wet Hop Winter Ale, 9-6/16 Czech-style Dark Lager, Side of Rice Rice Lager, Old Combine 4-Grain Lager.
