= Blucher, Saskatchewan =

Coordinates: 52°00′31″N 106°11′41″W

Location of Blucher in Saskatchewan

Blucher is an unincorporated community in Saskatchewan. Blucher lies southeast of Saskatoon and near several smaller communities, including Clavet, Allan, and Bradwell. It sits at an elevation of approximately 515 meters (1,690 feet) and follows the Central Standard Time (CST) without daylight saving time adjustments.

The area offers a mix of residential, agricultural, and industrial development.
