= Blucher (1814 ship) =

History

United States
- Builder: Boston
- Launched: 1809
- Captured: c.1814

United Kingdom
- Name: Blucher
- Namesake: Gebhard Leberecht von Blücher
- Owner: 1814:Laing & Co.; 1816:J. Goldie & Co.; 1818:Blachford & Co.
- Acquired: c.1814 by purchase of a prize
- Fate: Wrecked 1818 (possibly)

General characteristics
- Tons burthen: 240 (bm)
- Armament: 2 × 4-pounder guns

Blucher was launched at Boston in 1809 under another name. The British captured her around 1814 and new owners renamed her. She traded with India and South East Asia under a license from the British East India Company until she wrecked in 1818.

== Career ==
Laing & Co. purchased her as a prize. She first appeared in Lloyd's Register in 1814 with Kennedy, master, Laing & Co., owners, and trade London–Newfoundland. The next year Fullerton replaced Kennedy as master.

In 1816 her master changed from Fullerton to C. Kerr, her owner was Goldie & Co., and her trade was London–Hayti. By 1818 her trade was London–Cape of Good Hope. That was a far east as she could legally sail without a license from the British East India Company (EIC).

On 31 December 1816 Blucher sailed from the Cape to Île de France. The lists of vessels sailing under a license from the EIC do not include her, suggesting that she may have been sailing east of the Cape without permission.

Be that as it may, she arrived at Île de France on 4 January and on 5 February she was still there undergoing repairs. She had met with a gale after she had left the Cape, but was expected to sail for Batavia in eight or 10 days. On May 14 she sailed for Java.

On 14 August 1817 Blucher, Kerr, master, was again at the Cape, having reportedly come from Batavia and Île de France.

== Loss ==
On 1 March 1818 a gale caught Blucher in port at Île de France. She had to cut away all her masts and was so damaged as to be considered irreparable.

On 15 September 1818 Lloyd's Register reported that on 14 May Blucher, Kerr, master, sailed from Île de France, bound for Java. On 10 September 1819 Lloyd's Register reported that Blucher, Kerr, master, had arrived on 8 April at Batavia from Sourabaya. However, there are no other such mentions from late 1818 or late 1819.

Both Lloyd's Register and the Register of Shipping continued to carry Blucher, Kerr, master, with stale data to 1827 or 1823. Both were only as accurate as vessels' owners chose to keep them.
