= Lisa Biagiotti =

American journalist

- Born: August 20, 1979 (age 47)
- Education: Columbia University Graduate School of Journalism; Fulbright Award
- Occupations: Filmmaker; Journalist; Storyteller
- Years active: 2007–present
- Notable credit(s): Sundance Artist, deepsouth, Los Angeles Times
- Website: www.lisabiagiotti.com

Lisa Biagiotti (born August 20, 1979) is a filmmaker and journalist based in Los Angeles. She is the director and on-camera correspondent of On the Streets, a Los Angeles Times 12-part series and 72-minute feature documentary on homelessness in Southern California. She directed and produced deepsouth, an independent documentary about poverty, HIV/AIDS and LGBT issues in the rural American South. Biagiotti is a Fulbright Scholar and a graduate of the Columbia University Graduate School of Journalism. She is of Italian descent from her father and Hakka Chinese Jamaican descent from her mother.

== Career ==
Biagiotti is an inaugural Fellow in the Sundance New Frontier Artist Residency program in partnership with The Social Computing Group at MIT Media Lab. She speaks publicly about digital journalism, and independently producing and self-distributing films.

For her independent documentary deepsouth, Biagiotti spent two-and-a-half years reporting, driving 13,000 miles and interviewing more than 400 people. She was invited across rural America on a 150-stop grassroots film tour, and was invited to discuss the domestic epidemic at The White House and Clinton Global Initiative. Biagiotti's work has been featured in The New Yorker, The Atlantic, Los Angeles Times, PBS, NPR, Oxford American, and The Lancet. She writes about her 5-year journey of making the film in her Director’s Statement titled Same Virus, Different Disease.

Biagiotti is the producer of The World’s Toilet Crisis, an hour-long documentary that aired on the Vanguard series of Current TV in 2010. She produced short video series for the nightly newscast Worldfocus on WNET on under-reported topics covering homophobia in the Caribbean and the humanitarian crisis in eastern Congo—the latter was awarded a Robert F. Kennedy Journalism Award for International Television.

== Awards ==
Year	Award	Organization	Work	Award Category	Result
2001	Fulbright Award	United States Department of State	Research: Muslim immigration into Italy	Study/ Research Grant	Won
2009	Robert F. Kennedy Journalism Award	Robert F. Kennedy Center for Justice and Human Rights	Crisis in Congo series	International Television Category	Won
2009	National News Emmy Award	National Academy of Television Arts and Sciences	War in Congo series	Best Story in a Regularly Scheduled Newscast	Nominated
2012	SHOUT! LGBT Best Documentary	Sidewalk Film Festival	deepsouth	Best Documentary	Won
2012	Koronis Fest Special Filmmaker Award	Sidewalk Film Festival	deepsouth	Public Health	Won
2012	Best Documentary and Audience Favorite	Outflix Film Festival	deepsouth	Awards for Best Documentary and Audience Favorite	Won
2013
2013	Award for Freedom	Outfest Los Angeles LGBT Film Festival	deepsouth	Special Programming Award	Won
2013	Official Selection HRW Traveling Film Festival	Human Rights Watch Film Festival	deepsouth	Traveling Film Festival	Won
2013	Award for Best Documentary Feature	Polari Film Festival	deepsouth	Best Documentary Feature	Won
2013	Award for Best Feature Length Documentary	Pensacola LGBT Film Festival / ACLU of Florida	deepsouth	Best Feature Length Documentary	Won
2014	Most Captivating Voices of 2014	HIV Equal Online Magazine	deepsouth	Top 10 List	Won
2014	Livingston Award	Livingston Awards for Young Journalists	deepsouth	National Reporting	Nominated
