= Gebhard Leberecht von Blücher =

Prussian field marshal (1742–1819)

Gebhard Leberecht von Blücher Prince of Wahlstatt
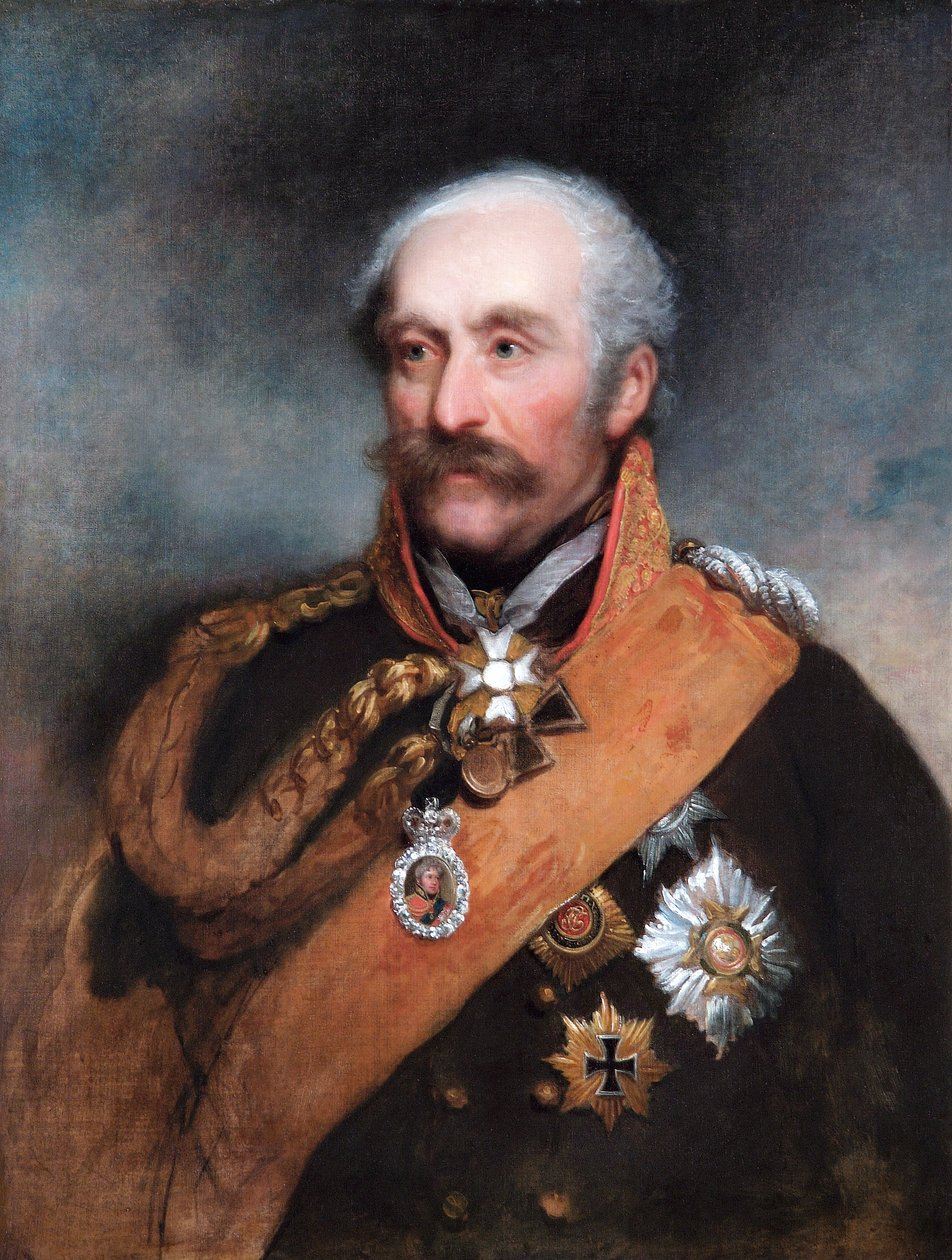
- Portrait by George Dawe, 1818
- Born: 16 December 1742; Rostock, Duchy of Mecklenburg-Schwerin, Holy Roman Empire
- Died: 12 September 1819 (aged 76); Krieblowitz, Province of Silesia, Kingdom of Prussia, German Confederation (present-day Krobielowice, Lower Silesia Voivodeship, Poland)
- Spouses: Karoline Amalie von Mehling (m. 1773; died 1791) Katharine Amalie von Colomb (m. 1795)
- Children: 7
- Relatives: Friedrich August Peter von Colomb (brother-in-law); Anton Felix von Blücher (great nephew)
- Military career
- Allegiance: Sweden; Prussia
- Branch: Prussian Army
- Service years: 1758–1815
- Rank: Generalfeldmarschall
- Nickname: Marschall Vorwärts (Marshal Forwards)
- Conflicts: Seven Years' War; Pomeranian War; Prussian invasion of Holland; French Revolutionary Wars; Napoleonic Wars; Battle of Jena-Auerstedt; Battle of Lübeck; German Campaign of 1813; Battle of Lützen (1813); Battle of Bautzen; Battle of Haynau; Autumn campaign; Battle of the Katzbach; Battle of Wartenburg; Battle of Leipzig; Campaign in north-east France (1814); Battle of Brienne; Battle of La Rothière; Six Days' Campaign; Battle of Vauchamps; Battle of Craonne; Battle of Laon; Battle of Paris; Waterloo campaign; Battle of Ligny (WIA); Battle of Waterloo; Occupation of Paris
- Awards: Star of the Grand Cross of the Iron Cross; Pour le Mérite; Grand Cross of the Iron Cross; Order of St. George; Military Order of William; Military Order of Maria Theresa
- Selected battles 1806 1813 1814 1815

Gebhard Leberecht von Blücher (German pronunciation: [ˈɡɛphaʁt ˈleːbəʁɛçt fɔn ˈblʏçɐ]; 16 December 1742 – 12 September 1819), Graf (count), later elevated to Fürst (prince) von Wahlstatt, was a German Generalfeldmarschall (field marshal). He earned his greatest recognition after leading his army against Napoleon at the Battle of Leipzig in 1813 and the Battle of Waterloo in 1815.

Blücher was born in Rostock, the son of a retired army captain. His military career began in 1758 as a hussar in the Swedish Army. He was captured by the Prussians in 1760 during the Pomeranian Campaign and thereafter joined the Prussian Army, serving as a hussar officer for Prussia during the remainder of the Seven Years' War. In 1773, Blücher was forced to resign by Frederick the Great for insubordination. He worked as a farmer until the death of Frederick in 1786, when Blücher was reinstated and promoted to colonel. For his success in the French Revolutionary Wars, Blücher became a major general in 1794. He became a lieutenant general in 1801 and commanded the cavalry corps during the Napoleonic Wars in 1806.

War broke out between Prussia and France again in 1813 and Blücher returned to active service at the age of 71. He became a leading hero of the Germans in the struggle to end foreign domination of their lands. He was appointed full general over the Prussian field forces and clashed with Napoleon at the Battles of Lützen and Bautzen. Later he won a critical victory over the French at the Battle of Katzbach. Blücher commanded the Prussian Army of Silesia at the Battle of Leipzig, where Napoleon was decisively defeated. For his role, Blücher was made a field marshal and given the title of Prince of Wahlstatt. After Napoleon's return in 1815, Blücher took command of the Prussian Army of the Lower Rhine and coordinated his force with that of the British and Allied forces under the Duke of Wellington. At the Battle of Ligny, he was injured, and the Prussians retreated. Partially recovered, Blücher resumed command and joined Wellington at the Battle of Waterloo, with the intervention of Blücher's army playing a decisive role in the final allied victory.

Blücher was made an honorary citizen of Berlin, Hamburg and Rostock. Known for his fiery personality, he was nicknamed Marschall Vorwärts ("Marshal Forward") by his soldiers because of his aggressive approach in warfare. Along with Paul von Hindenburg, he was the most highly decorated Prussian-German soldier in history: Blücher and Hindenburg are the only Prussian-German military officers to have been awarded the Star of the Grand Cross of the Iron Cross. A statue once stood in the square that bore his name, Blücherplatz, in Breslau (today Wrocław).

== Biography ==
=== Early life ===
Blücher was born on 16 December 1742 in Rostock, a Baltic port in northern Germany, then in the Duchy of Mecklenburg-Schwerin. His father, Christian Friedrich von Blücher, was a retired army captain, and his family belonged to the nobility and had been landowners in northern Germany since at least the 13th century. His mother was Dorothea Maria von Zülow, who also belonged to an old noble family from Mecklenburg.

Gebhard began his military career at the age of 16, (Note: Age of fourteen according to Chisholm 1911, p. 80.) when he joined the Swedish Army as a hussar. At the time, Sweden was at war with Prussia in the Seven Years' War. Blücher took part in the Pomeranian campaign of 1760, where Prussian hussars captured him in a skirmish. The colonel of the Prussian regiment, Wilhelm Sebastian von Belling (a distant relative), was impressed with the young hussar and had him join his own regiment.

Blücher took part in the later battles of the Seven Years' War, and as a hussar officer, gained much experience in light cavalry work. In peace, however, his ardent spirit led him into excesses of all kinds, such as the mock execution of a priest suspected of supporting Polish uprisings in 1772. As a result, he was passed over for promotion to major. Blücher submitted a rude letter of resignation in 1773, which Frederick the Great replied to with "Captain Blücher can take himself to the devil".

Blücher settled down to farming. Within 15 years, he had acquired financial independence and had become a Freemason. During Frederick the Great's lifetime, Blücher could not return to the army. However, the monarch died in 1786, and the following year, Blücher was reinstated as a major in his old regiment, the Red Hussars. He took part in the expedition to the Netherlands in 1787, and the next year was promoted to lieutenant colonel. In 1789, he received Prussia's highest military order, the Pour le Mérite, and in 1794, he became colonel of the Red Hussars. In 1793 and 1794, Blücher distinguished himself in cavalry actions against the French, and for his victory at Kirrweiler on 28 May 1794, he was promoted to major general. In 1801, he was made a lieutenant general.

=== Napoleonic Wars ===
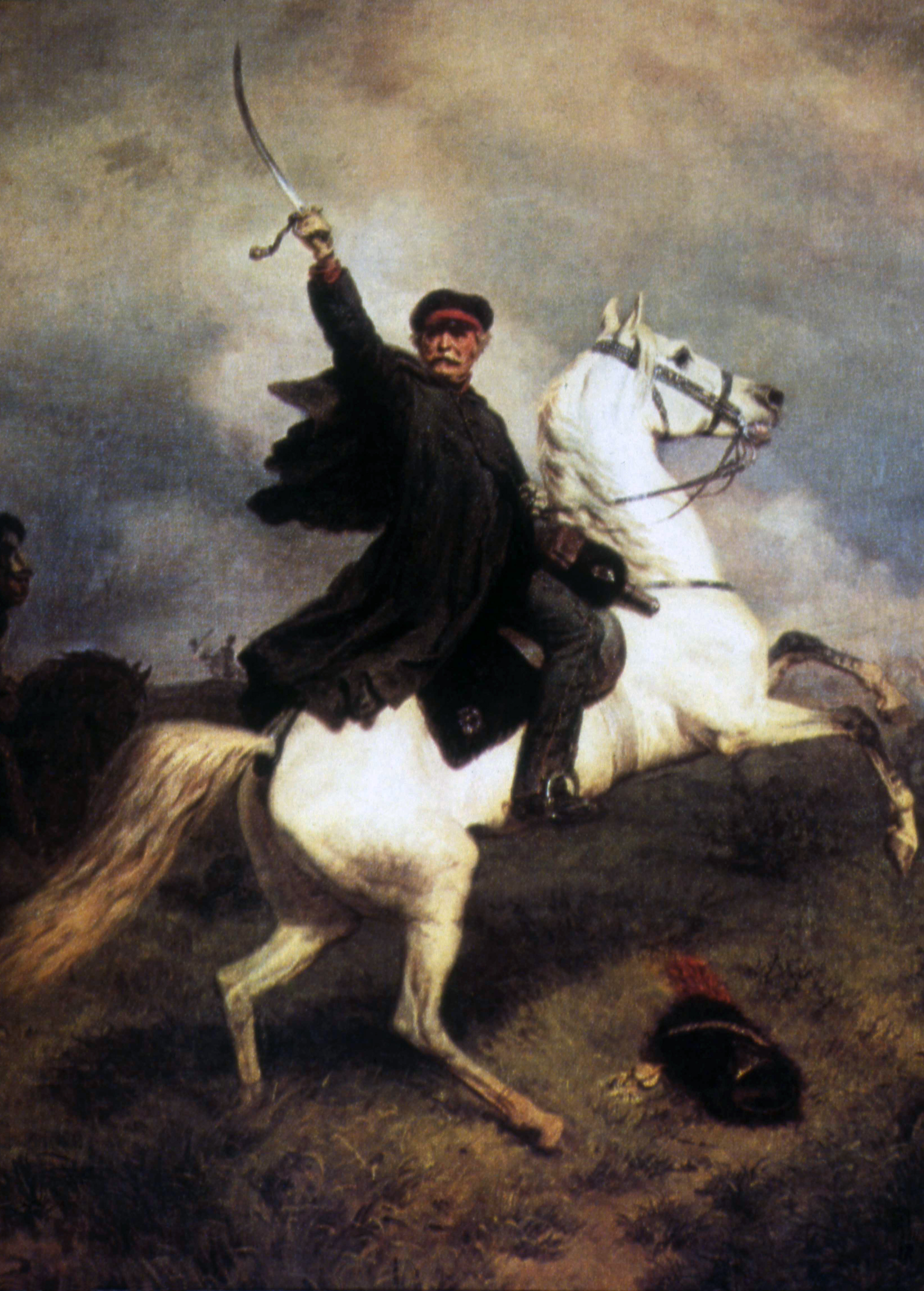
Marschall Vorwärts by Emil Hünten (1863)

Blücher was one of the leaders of the war party in Prussia in 1805, and he served as a cavalry general in the disastrous campaign of 1806. At the double Battle of Jena-Auerstedt, Blücher fought at Auerstedt, repeatedly leading the charges of the Prussian cavalry, but without success. During the retreat of the broken armies, he commanded the rearguard composed of Frederick Louis, Prince of Hohenlohe's corps. With the capitulation of the main body after the Battle of Prenzlau on 28 October, he found his march toward the north-east blocked. He led the remnant of his corps away to the north-west. Reinforcing his numbers with a division previously commanded by Karl August, Grand Duke of Saxe-Weimar, Blücher and his new chief of staff, Gerhard von Scharnhorst, reorganised his forces into two small corps totaling 21,000 men and 44 cannons. Nevertheless, he was defeated by two French corps at the Battle of Lübeck on 6 November. The next day, trapped against the Danish frontier by 40,000 French troops, he was compelled to surrender with less than 10,000 soldiers at Ratekau. Blücher insisted that clauses be written in the capitulation document that he had had to surrender due to lack of provisions and ammunition, and that his soldiers should be honoured by a French formation along the street. He was allowed to keep his sabre and to move freely, bound only by his word of honour. He was soon exchanged for future Marshal Claude Victor-Perrin, Duc de Belluno, and was actively employed in Pomerania, at Berlin, and at Königsberg until the conclusion of the war.

After the war, Blücher was looked upon as the natural leader of the Patriot Party, with which he was in close touch during the period of Napoleonic domination, but his hopes of an alliance with Austria in the war of 1809 were disappointed. In this year, he was made general of cavalry. In 1812, he expressed himself so openly on the alliance of Russia with France that he was recalled from his military governorship of Pomerania and virtually banished from the court.

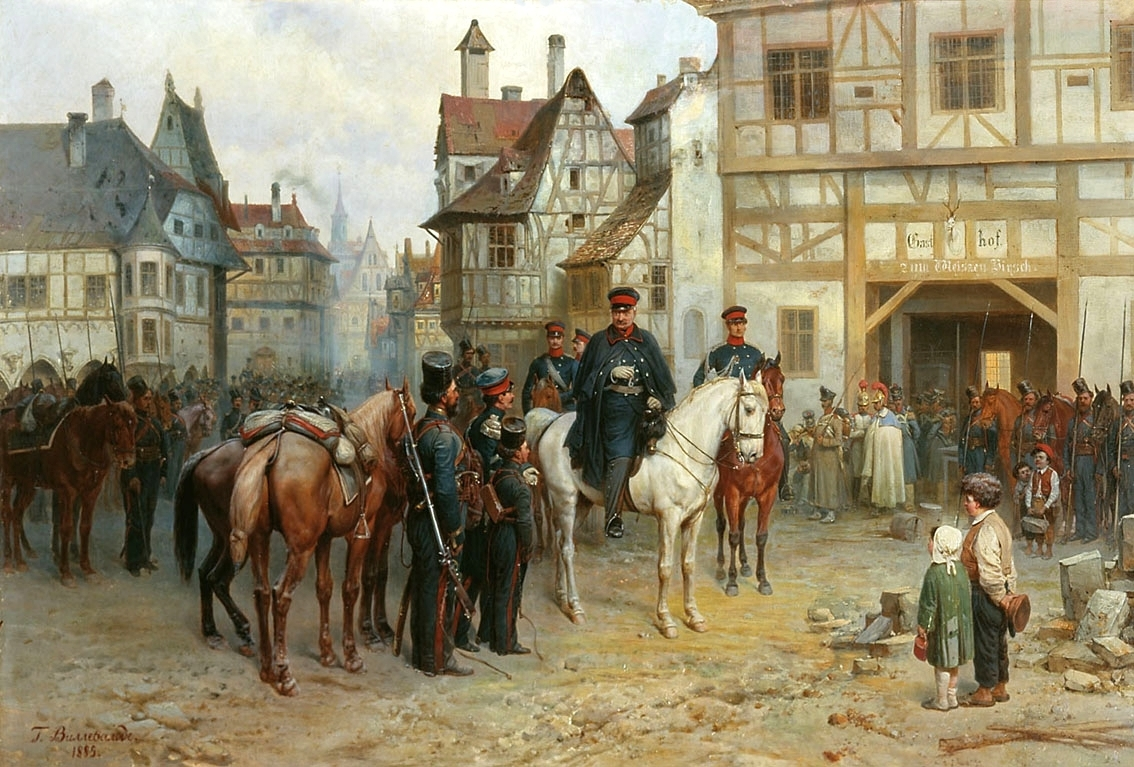
Gebhard Leberecht von Blücher in Bautzen by Bogdan Willewalde (1885)

Following the start of the War of Liberation in the spring of 1813, Blücher was again placed in high command, and he was present at Lützen and Bautzen. During the summer truce, he worked on the organisation of the Prussian forces; when the war was resumed, he became commander-in-chief of the Army of Silesia, with August von Gneisenau and Karl von Müffling as his principal staff officers and 40,000 Prussians and 50,000 Russians under his command during the autumn campaign. The most conspicuous military quality displayed by Blücher was his unrelenting energy.

The irresolution and divergence of interests usual in Sixth Coalition armies found in him a restless opponent. Knowing that if he could not induce others to co-operate, he was prepared to attempt the task at hand by himself, which often caused other generals to follow his lead. He defeated Marshal MacDonald at the Katzbach, and by his victory over Marshal Marmont at Möckern led the way to the decisive defeat of Napoleon at the Battle of the Nations at Leipzig. Blücher's own army stormed Leipzig on the evening of the last day of the battle. This was the fourth battle between Napoleon and Blücher, and the first that Blücher had won.

On the day of Möckern (16 October 1813), Blücher was made a field marshal. He later earned the nickname "Marshal Forwards" due to his tireless energy. And after the victory, he pursued the French with his accustomed energy. In the winter of 1813–1814, Blücher, with his chief staff officers, was mainly instrumental in inducing the Coalition sovereigns to carry the war into France itself.

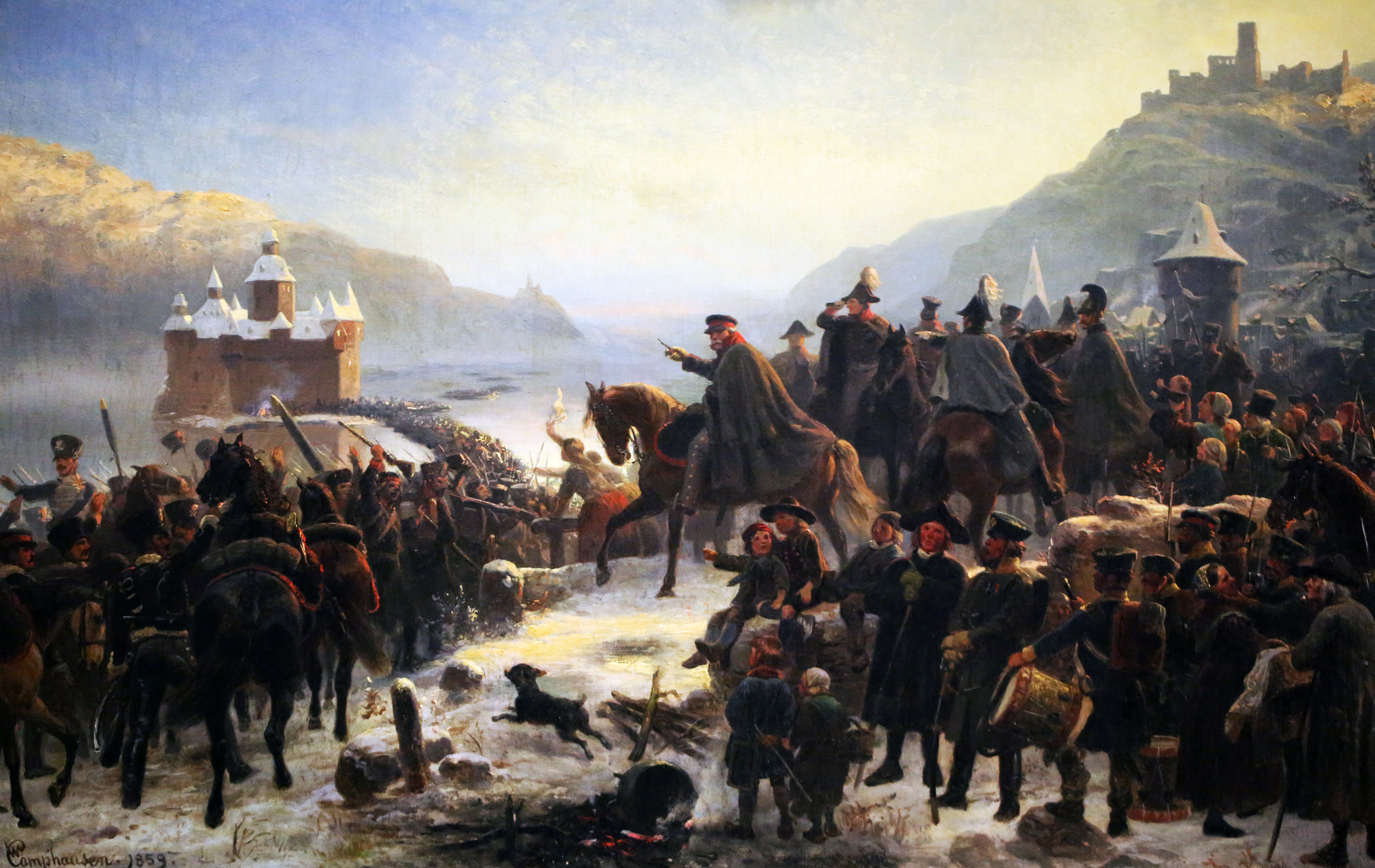
Blücher and the Army of Silesia crossing the Rhine near to Kaub, onto the French territory; 1 January 1814. By Wilhelm Camphausen (1859).

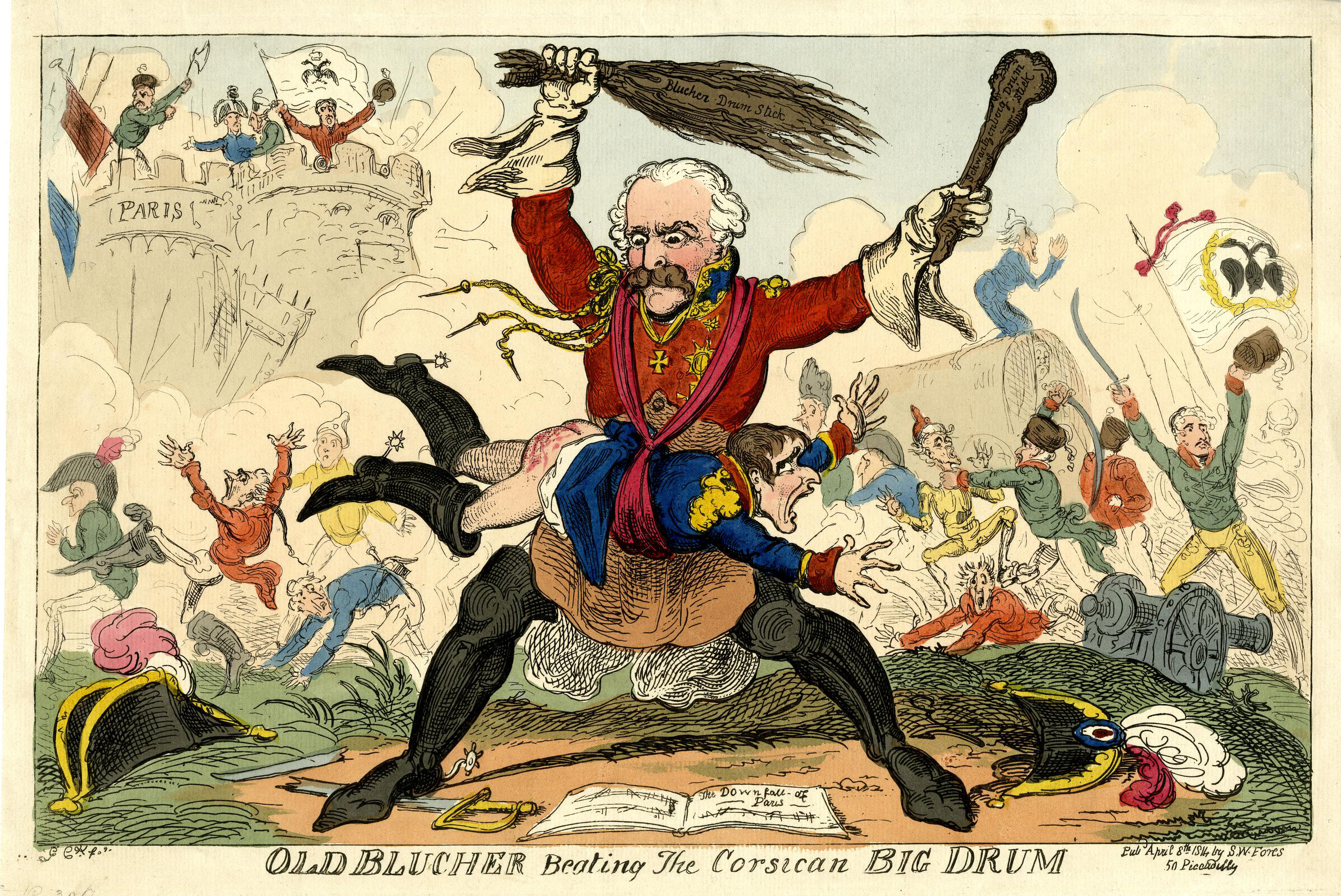
Old Blucher Beating the Corsican Big Drum, George Cruikshank, 8 April 1814

The Battle of Brienne and the Battle of La Rothière were the chief incidents of the first stage of the celebrated 1814 campaign in north-east France, and they were quickly followed by victories of Napoleon over Blücher at Champaubert, Vauchamps, and Montmirail. The courage of the Prussian leader was undiminished, though, and his victory against the vastly outnumbered French, at Laon (9 and 10 March) practically decided the fate of the campaign. However, his health had been severely affected by the strains of the previous two months, and he now suffered a breakdown, during which he lost his sight and suffered a delusion that a Frenchman had impregnated him with an elephant. Dominic Lieven wrote that the breakdown, "revealed the fragility of the coalition armies' command structure and just how much the Army of Silesia had depended on Blücher's drive, courage, and charisma.... The result was that for more than a week after the battle of Laon, the Army of Silesia... played no useful role in the war".

After this, Blücher infused some of his energy into the operations of the Prince Schwarzenberg's Army of Bohemia, and at last this army and the Army of Silesia marched in one body directly towards Paris. The victory of Montmartre, the entry of the allies into the French capital, and the overthrow of the First Empire were the direct consequences.

Blücher was in favour of punishing the city of Paris severely for the sufferings of Prussia at the hands of the French armies, but the allied commanders intervened. According to the Duke of Wellington, one of Blücher's plans involved blowing up the Jena Bridge near the Champ de Mars:

About blowing up the bridge of Jena there were two parties in the Prussian Army — Gneisenau and Muffling against, but Blücher violently for it. In spite of all I could do, he did make the attempt, even while I believe my sentinel was standing at one end of the bridge. But the Prussians had no experience of blowing up bridges. We, who had blown up so many in Spain, could have done it in five minutes. The Prussians made a hole in one of the pillars, but their powder blew out instead of up, and I believe hurt some of their own people.

In gratitude for his victories in 1814, King Frederick William III of Prussia created Blücher Prince (Fürst) of Wahlstatt (in Silesia on the Katzbach battlefield). (Note: a life peerage meaning Prince of the Battlefield – after Wahlstatt monastery at Legnickie Pole, the site of the decisive Battle of Legnica (or Battle of Liegnitz; Legnickie Pole is the name created in 1948 for Wahlstatt or 'battlefield', a posthumous name more popular only from the 18th century: to avoid mix-up with the 1760 battle of Liegnitz on 9 April 1241 where the Mongols of the Golden Horde had defeated a Polish-German army but then retreated to the Mongol Empire, instead of invading the remainder of Europe all the way to the Atlantic Ocean.) The king also awarded him estates near Krieblowitz (now Krobielowice, Poland) in Lower Silesia and a grand mansion at 2, Pariser Platz in Berlin (which in 1930 became the Embassy of the United States, Berlin). Soon afterward, Blücher paid a visit to England, where he was received with royal honours and cheered enthusiastically everywhere he went.

When Oxford University granted him an honorary doctorate (doctor of laws), he is supposed to have joked that if he was made a doctor, they should at least make Gneisenau an apothecary; "...for if I wrote the prescription, he made the pills."

=== Hundred Days and later life ===
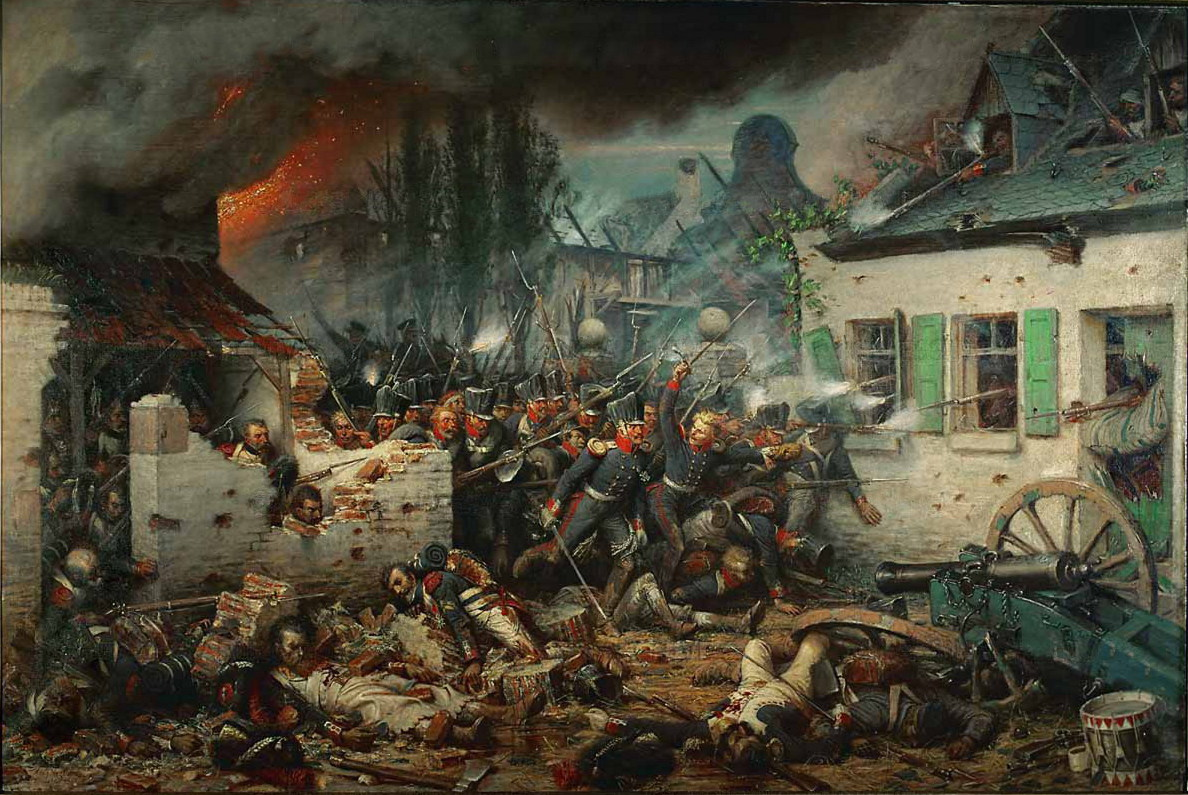
The Prussian attack on Plancenoit during the Battle of Waterloo

After the war, Frederick William III gave Blücher properties in the area of Neustadt (now Prudnik). In November of the same year, Blücher leased Kunzendorf, Mühlsdorf, Wackenau and Achthuben to a local farmer, Hübner, in exchange for 2,000 thalers, rolls of linen cloth and yarn. His wife also moved to Kunzendorf. While living in the area of Neustadt, he financed the families of the fallen soldiers, gave a few liters of beer to the local parish priest every day, and paid a doctor from Neustadt to treat the poor. Thanks to his efforts, a health resort called "Blücher's Spring" was established in Kunzendorf (it was destroyed together with the castle as a result of the battles of the Neustadt in 1945).

After the war, Blücher retired to Silesia. However, the return of Napoleon from Elba and his entry into Paris at the start of the Hundred Days, called him back to service. He was put in command of the Army of the Lower Rhine, with Gneisenau serving again as his chief of staff. At the outset of the Waterloo Campaign of 1815, the Prussians sustained a serious defeat at Ligny (16 June), in the course of which the old field marshal lay trapped under his dead horse for several hours and was repeatedly ridden over by cavalry, his life saved only by the devotion of his aide-de-camp Count Nostitz, who threw a greatcoat over his commander to obscure Blücher's rank and identity from the passing French. As Blücher was unable to resume command for some hours, Gneisenau took command, drew off the defeated army, and rallied it. In spite of Gneisenau's distrust of Wellington, he obeyed Blücher's last orders to direct the army's retreat towards Wavre, rather than Liège, to keep alive the possibility of joining the Prussian and Wellington's Anglo-allied armies together.

After bathing his wounds in a liniment of rhubarb and garlic, and fortified by a liberal internal dose of schnapps, Blücher rejoined his army. Gneisenau feared that the British had reneged on their earlier agreements and favoured a withdrawal, but Blücher convinced him to send two corps to join Wellington at Waterloo. He then led his army on a tortuous march along muddy paths, arriving on the field of Waterloo in the late afternoon. In spite of his age, the pain of his wounds, and the effort it must have taken for him to remain on horseback, Bernard Cornwell states that several soldiers attested to Blücher's high spirits and his determination to defeat Napoleon:

"Forwards!" he was quoted as saying. "I hear you say it's impossible, but it has to be done! I have given my promise to Wellington, and you surely don't want me to break it? Push yourselves, my children, and we'll have victory!" It is impossible not to like Blücher. He was 74 years [sic] (Note: He was 72, based on his birth date.) old, still in pain and discomfort from his adventures at Ligny, still stinking of schnapps and of rhubarb liniment, yet he is all enthusiasm and energy. If Napoleon's demeanour that day was one of sullen disdain for an enemy he underestimated, and Wellington's a cold, calculating calmness that hid concern, then Blücher is all passion.

With the battle hanging in the balance, Blücher's army intervened with decisive and crushing effect, his vanguard drawing off Napoleon's badly needed reserves, and his main body being instrumental in crushing French resistance. Wellington's army was able to overcome the Middle Guard, while Blücher's troops, in their final assault on Plancenoit, managed to push the Old Guard back, which retreated in good order unlike the rest of the fleeing French army. This victory led the way to a decisive victory through the relentless pursuit of the French by the Prussians. The two Coalition armies entered Paris on 7 July.

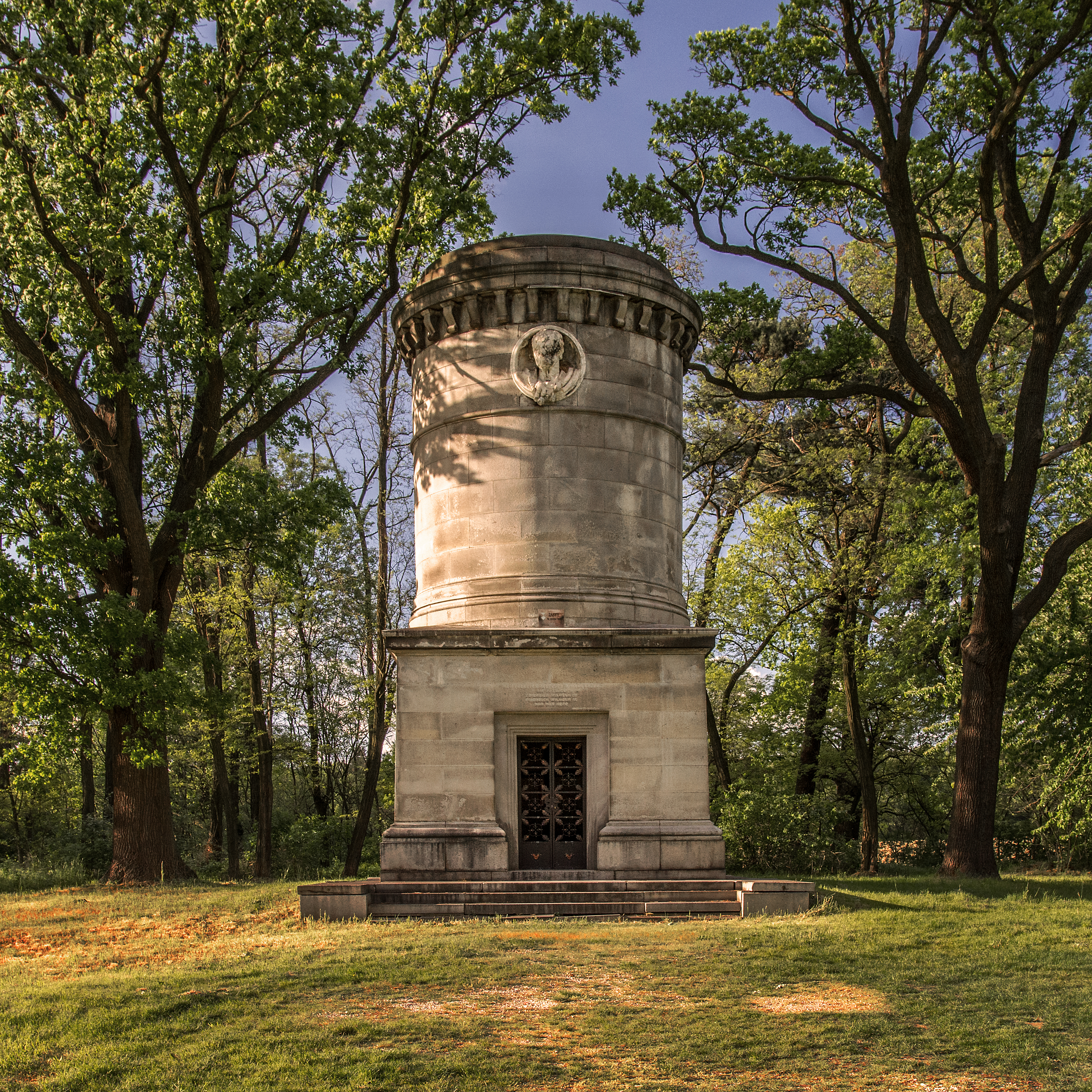
Blücher Mausoleum in ex-German Krieblowitz (now Krobielowice, Poland).

Blücher remained in the French capital for a few months, but his age and infirmities compelled him to retire to his Silesian residence at Krieblowitz. At the invitation of the British government, he made another state visit to England, to be formally thanked for his army and his role in the Waterloo campaign. When his carriage stopped on Blackheath Hill, overlooking London, he is said to have exclaimed, "What a city to sack!" However, this may have been a case of a foreign word being a homonym of an English word. According to J. H. Morgan, on seeing London he actually said "Was für plunder!" which translates as "What rubbish!"

Blücher died at Krieblowitz on 12 September 1819, aged 76. After his death, an imposing mausoleum was built for his remains. When Krieblowitz was conquered by the Red Army in 1945, Soviet soldiers broke into the Blücher mausoleum and scattered the remains. Soviet troops reportedly used his skull as a football. After 1989, some of his remains were taken by a Polish priest and interred in the catacomb of the church in Sośnica (German: Schosnitz), three km from the now Polish Krobielowice.

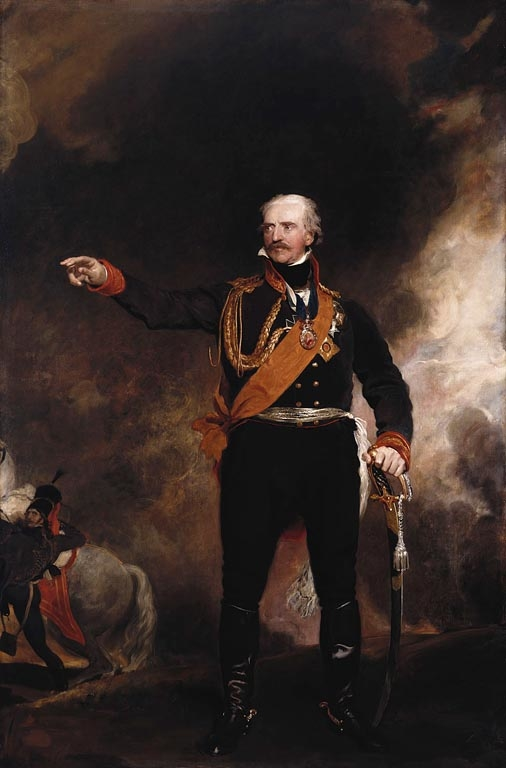
Portrait of Marshal Blücher by Sir Thomas Lawrence, 1814

== Assessment ==
Napoleon characterised him as a very brave soldier with no talent as a general, but he admired his attitude, which he described as a bull that looks all around him with rolling eyes and, when he sees danger, charges. Napoleon thought of him as stubborn and untiring, knowing no fear. He called him an old rascal who was always able to get up on his feet again and be ready for the next battle as, following a sound defeat, Blücher had, almost instantly, returned to attack him vigorously again.

It was to be said later among the Prussian military that Blücher established "a Prussian way of war" that had abiding influence:

The key to this way of war was Blücher's concept of victory. Like Napoleon, he placed tremendous emphasis on the decisive battle and achieving a decisive victory as quickly as possible at any cost. Also like Napoleon, he measured victory and defeat only in terms of battlefield results. Deviating very little from the Corsican's art of war, the objective of Blücher's Prussian way of war was to make contact with the enemy as quickly as possible, concentrate all forces, deliver the decisive blow, and end the war.

More generally, Blücher was a courageous and popular general who "had much to be proud of: energy, controlled aggression and a commitment to defeating the enemy army."

== Campaigns ==
- 1760: Pomeranian Campaign (as Swedish soldier; captured by Prussia; changed sides)
- Seven Years' War
- 1787: Expedition to the Netherlands with Red Hussars
- 1793–1794: French campaigns with Red Hussars
- 1806: Auerstedt, Pomerania, Berlin, Königsberg
- 1813: Lützen, Bautzen, Katzbach, Möckern, Leipzig
- 1814: Brienne, La Rothière, Champaubert, Vauchamps, Château-Thierry, Montmirail, Laon, Montmartre
- 1815: Lower Rhine (Battle of Ligny), Battle of Waterloo

== Publications ==
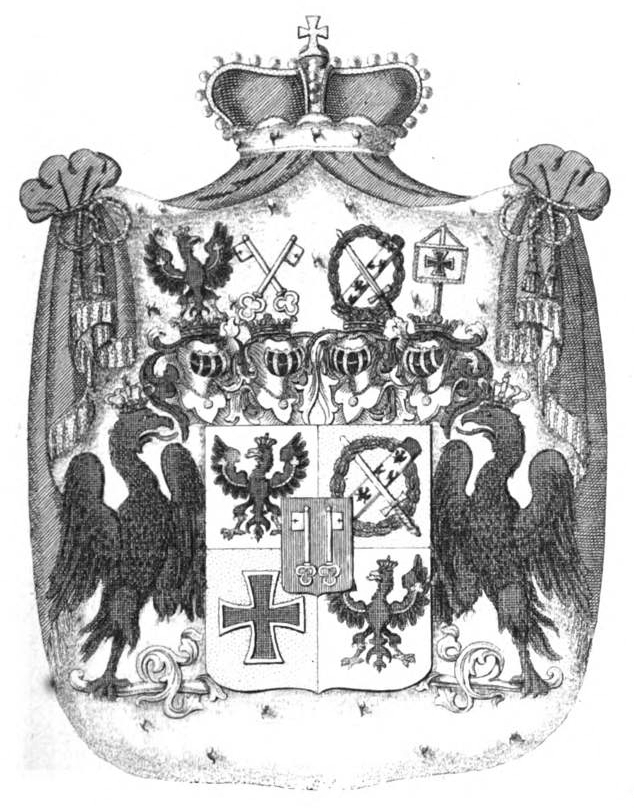
Coat of Arms of Count Blücher, Prince of Wahlstatt

His campaign journal covering the years 1793 to 1794 was published in 1796:

- Kampagne-Journal der Jahre 1793 und 1794 (Berlin: Decker, 1796)

A second edition of this diary, together with some of Blücher's letters, was published in 1914:

- Vorwärts! Ein Husaren-Tagebuch und Feldzugsbriefe von Gebhardt Leberecht von Blücher, introduced by General Field Marshal von der Goltz, edited by Heinrich Conrad (Munich: G. Müller, [1914])

His collected writings and letters (together with those of Yorck and Gneisenau) appeared in 1932:

- Gesammelte Schriften und Briefe / Blücher, Yorck, Gneisenau, compiled and edited by Edmund Th. Kauer (Berlin-Schöneberg: Oestergaard, [1932])

== Ancestry ==
Ancestors of Gebhard Leberecht von Blücher

8. Ulrich Hans von Blücher
4. Siegfried Ulrich von Blücher
9. Anna Sophia von Dechow
2. Christian Friedrich von Blücher
10. Franz Henning von Winterfeld, Herr auf Kirch-Mulsow
5. Ida Margarete von Winterfeld
11. Adelheid von Moltke
1. Gebhard Leberecht von Blücher, Fürst von Wahlstatt
12. Hans Joachim von Zülow, Herr auf Zülow
6. Barthold Hans von Zülow, Herr auf Pätrow und Toitenwinkel
13. Ida von Rantzau
3. Dorothea Maria von Zülow
14. Balthasar Valentin von Both
7. Dorothea Maria von Both
15. Katharina Dorothea von Lützow

== Family and descendants ==
Blücher was married twice: in 1773 to Karoline Amalie von Mehling and, after her death, in 1795 to Katharine Amalie von Colomb, sister of General Peter von Colomb. While this second marriage was without issue, by his first marriage Blücher had seven children, of whom two sons and a daughter survived infancy:

- Franz Ferdinand Joachim (1778–1829), major general in the Prussian army, wounded in battle in 1813 and thereafter mentally ill; married Bernhardine von Sass and had issue
- Friedrich Gebhardt Lebrecht (1780–1834), married Elisabeth von Conring, no issue
- Bernhardine Friederike (1786–1870), married firstly Adolf Ernst, Count von der Schulenburg, married secondly Maximilian Asche, Count von der Asseburg and had issue

The marshal's grandson, Count Gebhard Bernhard von Blücher, was created Prince Blücher of Wahlstatt (Serene Highness) in the Kingdom of Prussia on 18 October 1861, a hereditary title in primogeniture, the other members of his branch bearing the title count or countess. In 1832, he bought Raduň Castle in the Opava District and in 1847 the lands at Wahlstatt, Legnickie Pole, all of which remained in the family until the flight and expulsion of Germans from Poland and Czechoslovakia in 1945, which forced the family into exile in their mansion Havilland Hall in Guernsey, acquired by the 4th prince and his English wife, Evelyn, Princess Blücher. He bought the leasehold of nearby island Herm in 1889, but forced to leave by the government at the start of WW1 due to his nationality, despite having renounced these officially. Later the family moved to Eurasburg, Bavaria. The present head of the House of Blücher von Wahlstatt is Nicolaus, 8th Prince Blücher of Wahlstatt (born 1932), the heir apparent is his son, hereditary count Lukas (born 1956).

== Honours ==
He received the following orders and decorations:

- Kingdom of Prussia:
  - Pour le Mérite, 4 June 1789
  - Knight of the Black Eagle, April 1807
  - Knight of the Red Eagle
  - Iron Cross, 1st Class; Grand Cross, 1813; with Star, 1815
- Austrian Empire: Grand Cross of the Military Order of Maria Theresa, 1813
- Denmark: Knight of the Elephant, 4 July 1815
- Kingdom of Hanover: Grand Cross of the Royal Guelphic Order, 1816
- Electorate of Hesse: Grand Cross of the Golden Lion, 11 December 1815
- Netherlands: Grand Cross of the Military William Order, 8 July 1815
- Spain: Grand Cross of the Order of Charles III, 3 July 1811
- Sweden: Knight of the Seraphim, 28 April 1814
- United Kingdom: Honorary Grand Cross of the Bath (military), 18 August 1815
- Württemberg: Grand Cross of the Military Merit Order, 1814
- Russian Empire:
  - Knight of St. George, 1st Class, 8 October 1813
  - Knight of St. Andrew, 11 October 1813
  - Knight of St. Alexander Nevsky, 11 October 1813
  - Knight of St. Anna, 1st Class
  - Sword of Honour "for Bravery"

== Legacy ==
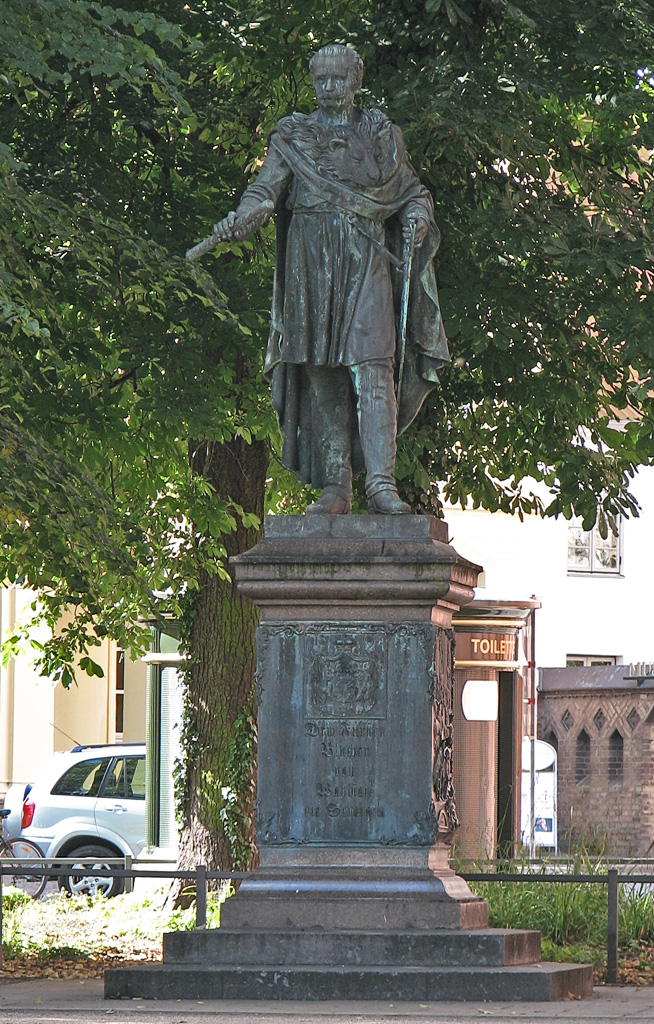
Blücher monument in front of the University of Rostock's main building, created by Johann Gottfried Schadow in collaboration with Johann Wolfgang von Goethe

=== Museums ===
The Rhineland town of Kaub has a museum dedicated to Blücher, commemorating in particular his crossing the Rhine with the Prussian and Russian armies, on New Year's night 1813–1814, in pursuit of the French.

=== Statues ===
After Blücher's death, statues were erected to his memory at Berlin, Breslau, Rostock, and Kaub (where his troops crossed the Rhine in pursuit of Napoleon's forces in 1813).

Blücher is honoured with a bust in the Walhalla temple near Regensburg.

=== Locomotives and ships ===
In gratitude for Blücher's service, George Stephenson, the pioneering British locomotive engineer, named a locomotive after him. The small mining village a few miles from Stephenson's birthplace in Wylam also bears the name Blucher in honour of him.

The Blucher was named after him, after the original ship was captured by the British and the new owners named it for him.

Three ships of the German navy have been named in honour of Blücher. The first to be so named was the corvette SMS Blücher, built at Kiel's Norddeutsche Schiffbau AG (later renamed the Krupp-Germaniawerft) and launched 20 March 1877. Taken out of service after a boiler explosion in 1907, she ended her days as a coal freighter in Vigo, Spain.

On 11 April 1908, the Panzerkreuzer SMS Blücher was launched from the Imperial Shipyard in Kiel. This ship was sunk on 24 January 1915 in the First World War at the Battle of Dogger Bank.

The Second World War German heavy cruiser Blücher was completed in September 1939, and pronounced ready for service on 5 April 1940 after completing a series of sea trials and training exercises. The vessel was sunk four days later near Oslo during the invasion of Norway.

=== Film portrayals ===
Blücher was played by German actor Otto Gebühr in the 1929 film Waterloo. In 1932, he was the subject of the biographical film Marshal Forwards, in which he was played by Paul Wegener. It was part of a group of Prussian films released during the era.

He was portrayed by Soviet actor Sergo Zakariadze in the 1970 Soviet-Italian film Waterloo.

=== Miscellany ===
Blücher also has a boarding house named after him at Berkshire-based Wellington College. The Blucher, as it is known, is a boys' house renowned for sporting and academic prowess.

A popular German saying, ran wie Blücher gehen ("to charge like Blücher"), meaning that someone is taking very direct and aggressive action, in war or otherwise, refers to Blücher. The full German saying, now obsolete, relates to the Battle of the Katzbach in 1813: "ran wie Blücher an der Katzbach gehen" ("to advance like Blücher at Katzbach"), describing vigorous, forceful behaviour.

Vasily Blyukher's last name was given to his family by a landlord in honour of Gebhard.

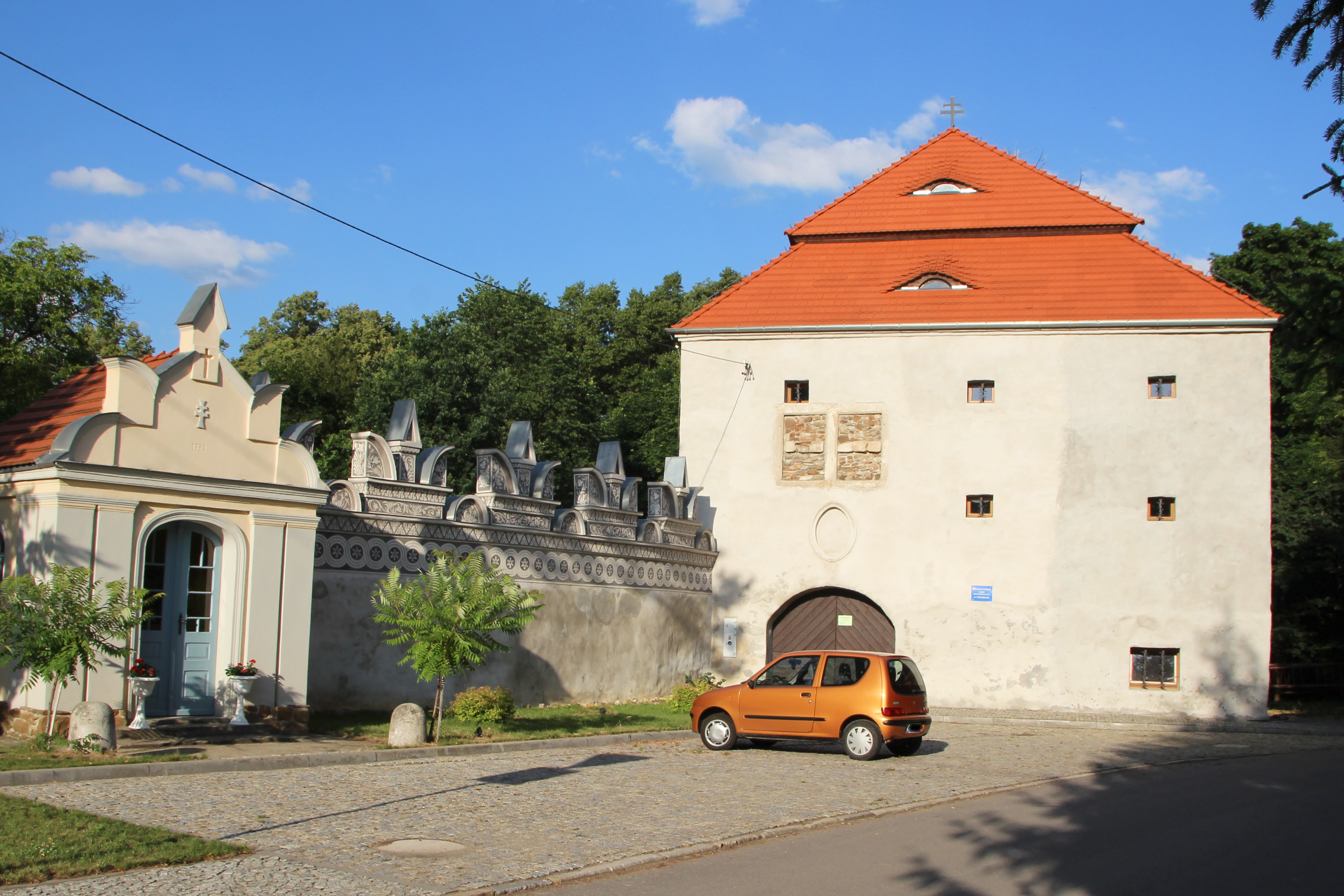
Castle in Trzebina (German: Kunzendorf), near Prudnik
(owned by the Blücher family 1812–1817)

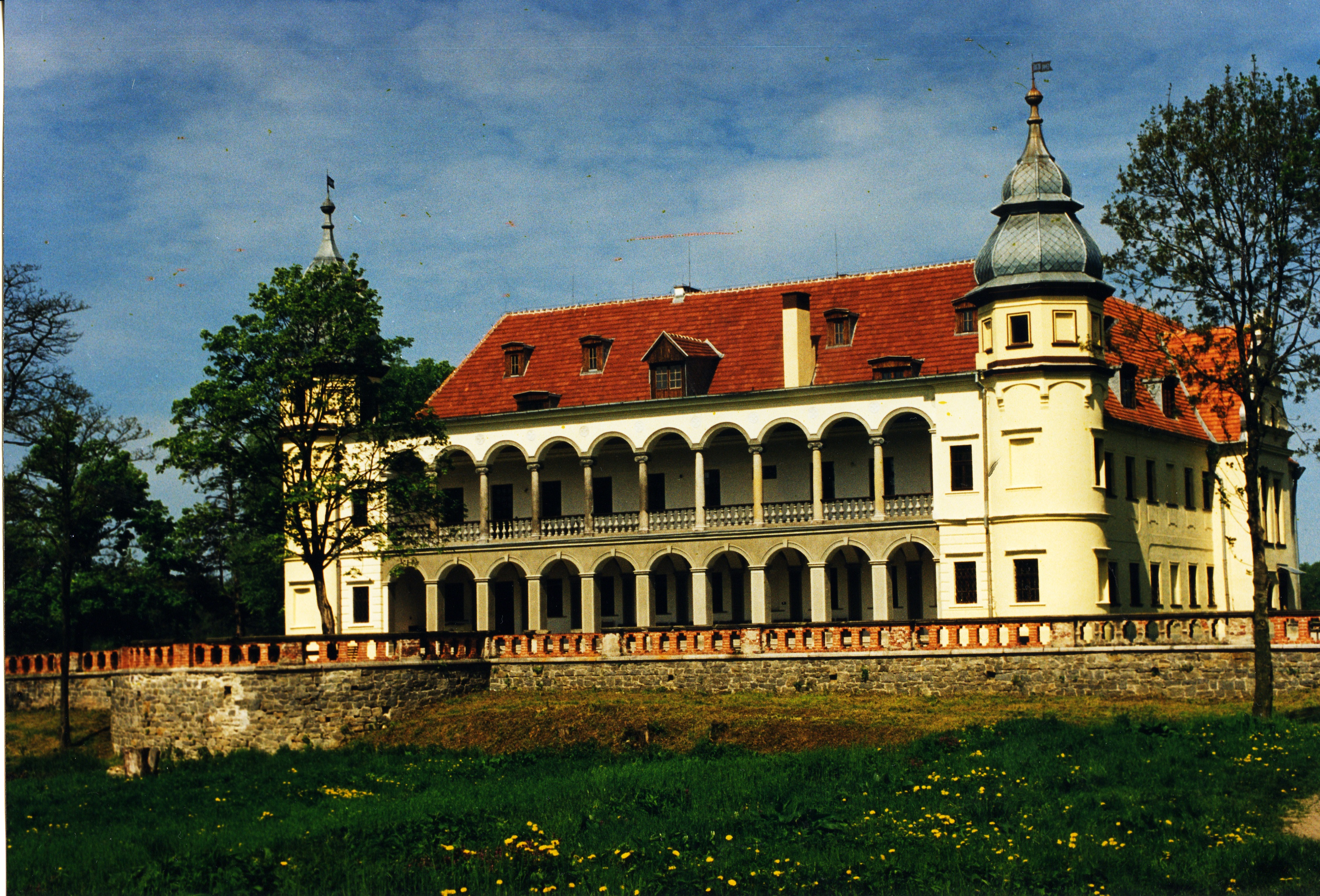
Krobielowice (German: Krieblowitz) Castle, Lower Silesia
(owned by the Blücher family 1814–1945)

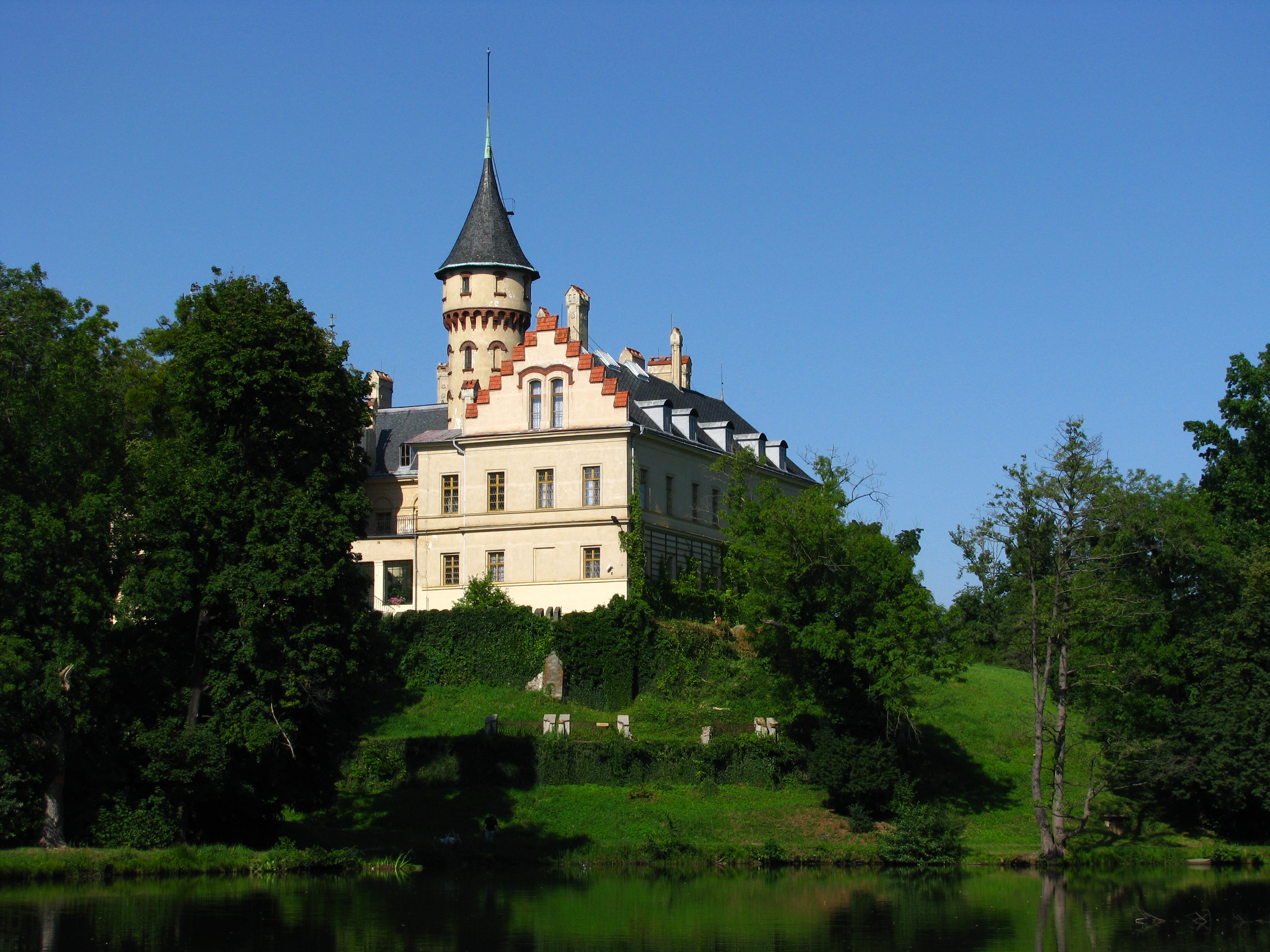
Raduň Castle, Czech Republic
(owned by the Blücher family 1832–1945)

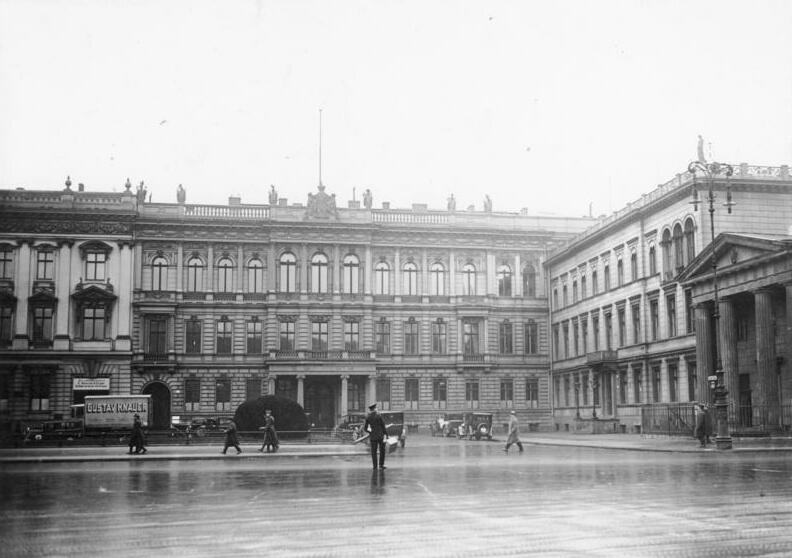
Blücher-Palais near Brandenburg Gate (U.S. Embassy, 1930–1941)

== See also ==
- Evelyn Princess Blücher
- Blücher Order
- Blucher shoe
- Blüchern
- Brothers von Blücher

== Sources ==
- Barbero, Alessandro (2006). The Battle: A New History of Waterloo. Translated by Cullen, John. Walker & Company. ISBN 0-8027-1500-1.
- Cornwell, Bernard (2015). Waterloo: The History of Four Days, Three Armies and Three Battles. Lulu Press. p. front cover. ISBN 978-1312925229. – The pages numbers are given as offsets in the electronic view, these will vary from the page numbers in a physical book
- Kircheisen, F.M. (2010). Memoires Of Napoleon I.
- Leggiere, Michael V. (2014). Blucher: Scourge of Napoleon. University of Oklahoma Press. ISBN 978-0-8061-4567-9.
- Lieven, Dominic (2009). Russia Against Napoleon: The Battle for Europe, 1807 to 1814. Penguin Books Limited. ISBN 978-0-14-194744-0.
- Montefiore, Simon Sebag (2016). The Romanovs 1613–1918. Orion Publishing Group Ltd. p. 313. ISBN 978-0-297-85266-7.
- Polier, Christoph Graf von (2016). "Gebhard Leberecht Blücher von Wahlstatt". Geneanet.
- Stanhope, Phillips Henry (1888). Notes of conversaciones with the Duke of Wellington, 1831–1851. New York: Da Capo Press. p. 119.
- "Blücher von Wahlstatt family tree". Vítejte. 3 March 2012. Archived from the original on 11 December 2023.
- Hofschröer, Peter (1999). 1815: The Waterloo Campaign. The German Victory. Vol. 2. London: Greenhill Books. ISBN 978-1-85367-368-9.
- Morgan, J.H. (1946). Assize of Arms. New York: Oxford University Press. ISBN 978-1-78912-392-0.

Attribution
