= Deepsouth =

- Film poster
- Directed by: Lisa Biagiotti
- Produced by: Lisa Biagiotti; Duy Linh Tu; Joe Lindquist
- Starring: Joshua Alexander; Monica Johnson; Kathie Hiers; Tamela King; Cedric Sturdevant; Dimitre Blutcher
- Cinematography: Duy Linh Tu
- Edited by: Joe Lindquist
- Music by: John Chin
- Release dates: July 23, 2012 (International AIDS Conference, Washington, D.C.); December 1, 2014 (Digital and DVD)
- Running time: 72 minutes
- Country: United States
- Language: English

Deepsouth is a 2012 American documentary film about the neglected HIV/AIDS crisis in the rural American South. Beneath layers of history, poverty, and soaring HIV infections, three Americans redefine traditional Southern values to create their own solutions to survive.

On December 1, 2014, the film was self-distributed and digitally released. Seventy communities across the United States screened deepsouth for World AIDS Day with a 10-hour live-stream with cast/crew.

== Synopsis ==
Joshua Alexander, a college student, seeks the support of an underground gay family miles away from his suffocating Mississippi Delta hometown. With no funds and few resources, Monica Johnson tries tirelessly to unite reluctant participants at her annual HIV retreat in rural Louisiana. Kathie Hiers, an Alabama activist, spends 120 days a year on the road fighting a bureaucracy that continues to ignore the South.

== Critical reception ==
The film has become the quiet anthem of the current HIV/AIDS movement in the U.S. deepsouth has toured the international LGBTQ and human rights festival circuits, and was invited into communities on a 150-stop grassroots tour. Director Lisa Biagiotti has been invited to The White House, featured in The New Yorker, and has presented the issue at the Clinton Global Initiative University.

The film is being taught as part of public health, law, journalism, sociology, nursing, gender studies and rural studies programs in universities across the country. The Mississippi Department of Health leverages deepsouth for sensitivity and anti-stigma training of new hire Disease Intervention Specialists.

deepsouth is an unconventional social issues documentary because of its approach to storytelling and style. Its three-part narrative embeds research and data in every scene, but without expert interviews or statistical plot points.

Journalism

- Sarah Stillman's article in The New Yorker noted that deepsouth “burrows into the crevices of culture, where statistics can’t quite creep.”
- Jina Moore's article on translating public health into media in the Columbia Journalism Review stated: "There are no experts, no statistics, and no messaging in Biagiotti’s film. In fact, she wouldn’t even call it a film about HIV. 'HIV was really the setting of deepsouth, not the topic or the issue,' she told me."

Science

- In the peer-reviewed medical journal The Lancet, Rebecca Heald asserted: "It is astounding that the HIV crisis in the southern states of the USA still seems to be of such low priority to individuals who have the power to make a difference. Without taking anything away from the hard-working protagonists in deepsouth, the lack of political support for their efforts to combat stigma for people with HIV/AIDS makes the goal of achieving a more open and understanding society seem as distant and remote as the towns and villages in which these people live."
- Oriol R. Gutierrez Jr. endorsed the film in the HIV community with his cover story in the monthly magazine POZ: “From slavery to segregation to HIV, the Southern United States sadly has traded one societal ill for another. The documentary deepsouth sheds new light on why the region has not overcome its struggle to break free of AIDS.”

Film/art

- Anthony Kaufman from SundanceNOW wrote: "Lisa Biagiotti's deepsouth is a more evocative exploration of gay black Americans...Thanks to Joey Lindquist's well-paced editing and Duy Linh Tu's mix of verite' and elegiac cinematography capturing the scorching sun, marshes and lush greenery of Alabama, Louisiana and Mississippi deepsouth transcends straight-forward advocacy to become an affecting and resonant portrait of an AIDS crisis that hits closer to home..."
- Hassan Vawda of UK-based Polari Magazine said: "With two years of subtle organic research of the area, learning the surroundings and most effectively, getting to know the people there, director Lisa Biagiotti scratches the surface and transcends the heavy weight of the issue by tackling it in an incredibly effective way – choreographing a fluid dance between information and art."
- Drew Gibson concluded in Daily Kos: “Ultimately, deepsouth succeeds in the only thing a piece of art need succeed at: it speaks to people. Documentaries like An Inconvenient Truth or Bowling For Columbine don’t speak to people. They speak at people. In deepsouth, director Lisa Biagiotti and the entire cast & crew of the film do what southerners do best. They charm you.”

== Film festivals ==
- Human Rights Watch Film Festival (Providence, RI)
- Human Rights Watch Film Festival (San Francisco, CA)
- Human Rights Watch Film Festival (Washington, DC)
- Human Rights Watch Film Festival (Tucson, AZ)
- Human Rights Watch Film Festival (Gambier, OH)
- Clarksdale Film Festival (Clarksdale, MS)
- Human Rights Watch Film Festival (Oneonta, NY)
- IX Cinema Mostra Aids (São Paulo, Brazil)
- Florence Queer Festival (Florence, Italy)
- Reeling: The Chicago Lesbian & Gay International Film Festival (Chicago, IL)
- Polari Film Festival (Austin, TX)
- Pensacola LGBT Film Festival (Pensacola, FL)
- 4th Annual Queer Film Festival (Towson, MD)
- Portland Lesbian & Gay Film Festival (Portland, OR)
- Outfest Los Angeles LGBT Film Festival (Los Angeles, CA)
- Human Rights Watch Film Festival (New York, NY)
- Key West PRIDE Film Festival (Key West, FL)
- Boston LGBT Film Festival (Boston, MA)
- Crossroads Film Festival (Jackson, MS)
- Fringe! London Gay Film Festival (London, UK)
- Outflix Film Festival (Memphis, TN)
- Sidewalk Motion Picture Festival (Birmingham, AL)

== Awards ==
Year	Award	Organization	Work	Award Category	Result
2012	SHOUT! LGBT Best Documentary	Sidewalk Film Festival	deepsouth	Best Documentary	Won
2012	Koronis Fest Special Filmmaker Award	Sidewalk Film Festival	deepsouth	Public Health	Won
2012	Best Documentary and Audience Favorite	Outflix Film Festival	deepsouth	Awards for Best Documentary and Audience Favorite	Won
2013
2013	Award for Freedom	Outfest Los Angeles LGBT Film Festival	deepsouth	Special Programming Award	Won
2013	Official Selection HRW Traveling Film Festival	Human Rights Watch Film Festival	deepsouth	Traveling Film Festival	Won
2013	Award for Best Documentary Feature	Polari Film Festival	deepsouth	Best Documentary Feature	Won
2013	Award for Best Feature Length Documentary	Pensacola LGBT Film Festival / ACLU of Florida	deepsouth	Best Feature Length Documentary	Won
2014	Most Captivating Voices of 2014: Lisa Biagiotti	HIV Equal Online Magazine	deepsouth	Top 10 List	Won
2014	Livingston Award: Lisa Biagiotti	Livingston Awards for Young Journalists	deepsouth	National Reporting	Nominated
