= Sarah Blacher Cohen =

American dramatist (1936–2008)

- Born: June 11, 1936; Appleton, Wisconsin, U.S.
- Died: November 10, 2008 (aged 72); Albany, New York, U.S.
- Occupations: Writer, scholar, playwright, professor
- Spouse: Gary Cohen

Sarah Blacher Cohen (June 11, 1936 in Appleton, Wisconsin, – November 10, 2008 in Albany, New York) was an American writer, scholar, and playwright, and a professor at SUNY Albany for 30 years. Her area of specialty was Jewish American fiction.

Her published books include Comic Relief: Humor in Contemporary American Literature, Saul Bellow's Enigmatic Laughter (1974), and Cynthia Ozick's Comic Art: From Levity to Liturgy. She edited From Hester Street to Hollywood: The Jewish-American Stage and Screen (Jewish Literature and Culture Series), Making a Scene: The Contemporary Drama of Jewish-American Women, and Jewish Wry: Essays on Jewish Humor. Her plays include The Ladies Locker Room, and Molly Picon's Return Engagement, a biographical play with music on the star of Yiddish theater. She collaborated with Joanne Koch, starting in 1989 on Sophie, Totie, and Belle, a musical on performers Sophie Tucker, Totie Fields, and Belle Barth. 'She and Joanne Koch also co-authored the plays Danny Kaye: Supreme Court Jester, Soul Sisters, Henrietta Szold: Woman of Valor, an adaptation of Saul Bellow stories entitled Saul Bellow's Stories Onstage: The Old System and a Silver Dish, and the multicultural musical Soul Sisters. Cohen and Koch co-edited an anthology of ten plays Shared Stages: Ten American Dramas of Blacks and Jews, including Driving Miss Daisy, Fires in the Mirror, and Soul Sisters. She collaborated with Isaac Bashevis Singer on the off-Broadway play Schlemiel the First. Cohen also gave talks and delivered papers, including "The Unkosher Comediennes: From Sophie Tucker to Joan Rivers." Her husband was Gary Cohen. She died of Charcot-Marie-Tooth disease on November 10, 2008, age 72.
