= Miłowice, Opole Voivodeship =

Miłowice Mühlsdorf
- Village
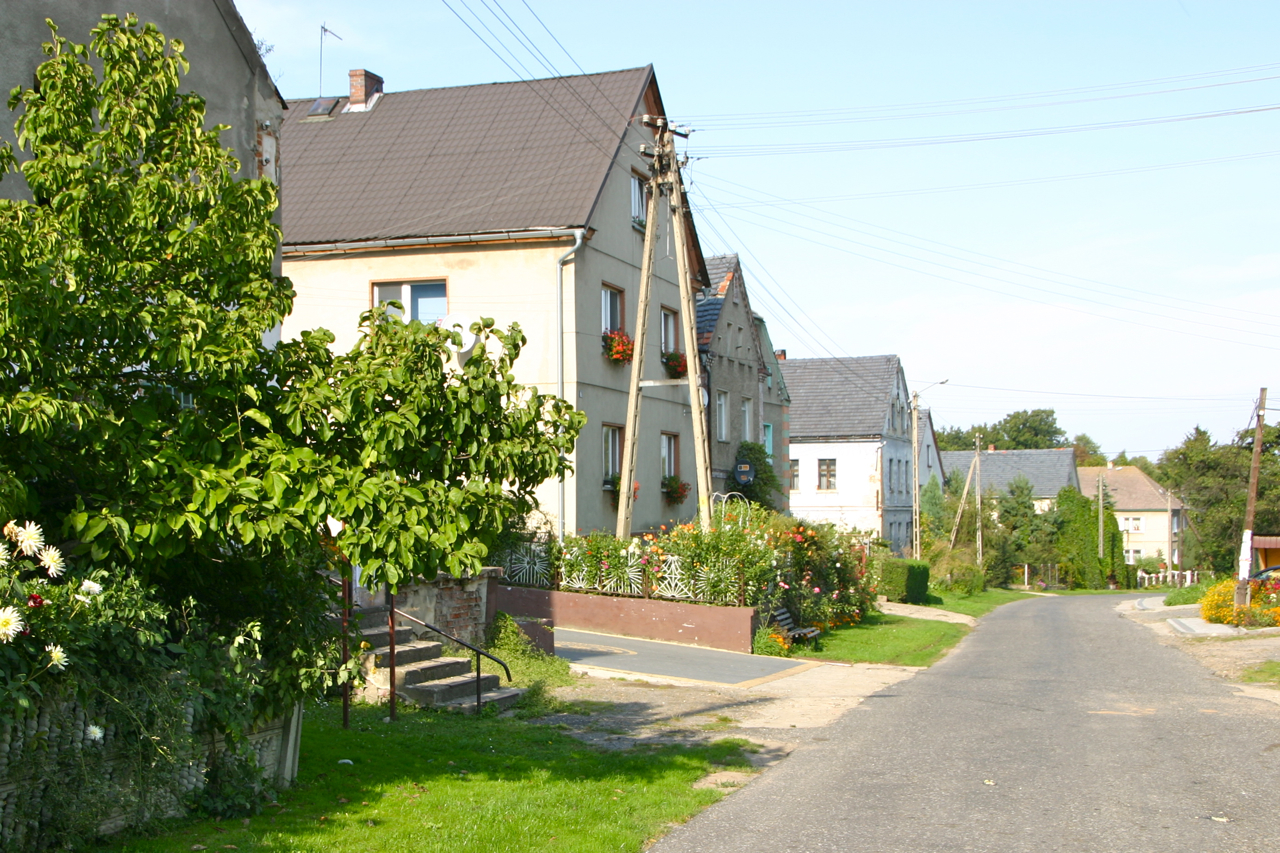

- Location within Poland
- Coordinates: 50°23′38″N 17°36′21″E
- Country: Poland
- Voivodeship: Opole
- County: Prudnik
- Gmina: Biała
- First mentioned: 1319
- Time zone: UTC+1 (CET)
  - Summer (DST): UTC+2 (CEST)
- Vehicle registration: OPR

Miłowice ([mʲiwɔˈvʲit͡sɛ], additional name in German: Mühlsdorf) is a village in the administrative district of Gmina Biała, within Prudnik County, Opole Voivodeship, in southern Poland.

A Polish citizen was murdered by Nazi Germany in the village during World War II.

== People born in Miłkowice ==
- Josef Joachim Menzel, German historian

== See also ==
- Prudnik Land
