= Blücher (surname) =

Blücher or Bluecher is a German surname. The Russified form is Blyukher. Notable people with the surname include:

- Gebhard Leberecht von Blücher (1742–1819), a Napoleonic era Prussian general
- Evelyn, Princess Blücher (1876–1960), diarist and memoirist, wife of Gebhard von Blücher (1865–1931)
- Franz Blücher (1896–1959), German politician
- Heinrich Blücher (1899–1970), German philosopher
- Vasily Blyukher (1899–1938), Marshal of the Soviet Union (named after the Prussian general)
- Wolfgang Graf von Blücher (1917–1941), German World War II paratrooper
- Erik Blücher (born 1953), expatriate Norwegian far-right activist
