= Ludwig Petry =

German medievalist, historian of modern age and historian of eastern europe

Ludwig Petry (b. 3 June 1908 in Alzey, d. 25 November 1991 in Mainz) was a German historian.

Petry was born into lawyer's family and grew up in Darmstadt. After the Matriculation examination he was studying Germans studies, history and history of arts at the University of Freiburg.

Petry gained PhD in 1932. His thesis was titled Die Popplau. Eine Breslauer Kaufmannsfamilie des 15. und 16. Jahrhunderts He passed his habilitation in 1937. The title of his thesis was Breslau und seine Oberherren aus dem Haus Habsburg 1526-1635. Ein Beitrag zur politischen Geschichte der Stadt Breslau From 1950 to 1973 he was working at the University of Mainz.

Petry was member of the Historische Kommission für Nassau and the Verein für schlesische Kirchengeschichte. He was editor-in-chief of Zeitschrift für Ostforschung (today Zeitschrift für Ostmitteleuropaforschung) from 1969 to 1991.

== Publications ==
- Die Popplau. Eine schlesische Kaufmannsfamilie des 15. und 16. Jahrhunderts (= Historische Untersuchungen. Band 15). Marcus, Breslau 1935.
- Dem Osten zugewandt. Gesammelte Aufsätze zur schlesischen und ostdeutschen Geschichte. Festgabe zum 75. Geburtstag. Thorbecke, Sigmaringen 1983, ISBN 3-7995-6140-4.
- Breslau und seine ersten Oberherren aus dem Hause Habsburg 1526–1635. Ein Beitrag zur politischen Geschichte der Stadt. Scripta-Mercaturae, St. Katharinen 2000, ISBN 3-89590-098-2.
