= Z.B.U.K.U =

Polish rapper (born 1992)

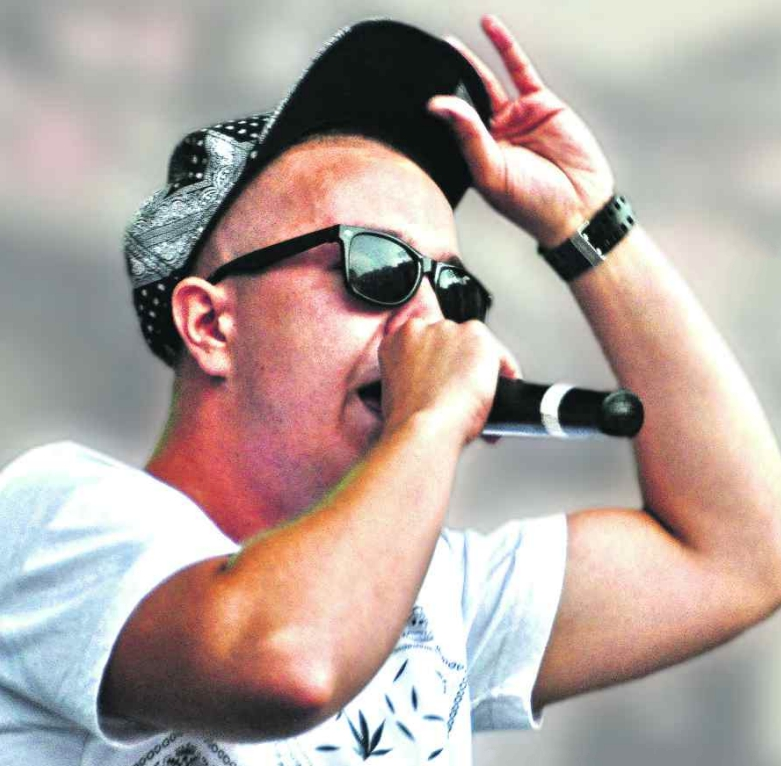
- Z.B.U.K.U in Prudnik, 2015

Background information
- Born: Michał Buczek; 19 September 1992 (age 34); Prudnik
- Genres: Hip hop, freestyle rap
- Occupations: Rapper, singer, songwriter
- Years active: 2010–present
- Label: Step Records

Michał Buczek (Polish pronunciation: [ˈmʲi.xaw ˈbu.t͡ʂɛk], born 19 September 1992, in Prudnik), also known as Z.B.U.K.U is a Polish rapper, singer and songwriter.

== Discography ==
=== Albums ===
Title	Album details	Peak chart positions	Certifications
Title	Album details	POL	Certifications
Że życie ma sens	Released: 16 October 2013; Label: Step Records	18	ZPAV: Gold Record
Życie szalonym życiem	Released: 6 December 2014; Label: Step Records	8	ZPAV: Platinum Record
Kontrabanda: brat bratu bratem	Released: 5 June 2015; Label: Step Records	3	ZPAV: Gold Record
W drodze po nieśmiertelność	Released: 2 December 2016; Label: Step Records	30	ZPAV: Gold Record
Konsekwentnie	Released: 26 October 2018; Label: Step Records	11	—

=== Singles ===
Title	Year	Peak chart positions	Certifications	Album
Title	Year	POL	Certifications	Album
Torreador bitów	2013	41	—	Że życie ma sens
Chada – Jeszcze więcej ognia	2014	—	—	Syn Bogdana
Oddech	2014	—	—	—
Na lepsze	2014	—	—	Życie szalonym życiem
Młoda krew	2014	—	—	Życie szalonym życiem
Polska Wersja – Oddalam się	2016	—	POL: Platinum Record	Notabene

=== Music videos ===
Year	Song	Directed	Album	Source
2012	Witam cię w Polsce	Michał Pawełczak, Tomasz Siemek	—	
2013	To więcej niż muzyka	Michał Pawelczak	Że życie ma sens	
2013	Skurwysyny	Filip Ozarowski	Że życie ma sens	
2013	Czuję to	Filmotion	Że życie ma sens	
2013	Torreador bitów	Dirt Video	Że życie ma sens	
2013	Chcę żyć	Delaflow	Że życie ma sens	
2013	Hip Hop Champions	Delaflow, InSane Films	Że życie ma sens	
2014	Dupy kumple blanty rap	Delaflow	Że życie ma sens	
2014	Nie będziesz pierwszy	Delaflow	Życie szalonym życiem	
2014	Na lepsze	Delaflow	Życie szalonym życiem	
2014	Młoda krew	Delaflow	Życie szalonym życiem	
2014	Gierek	M.L. Filmz	Życie szalonym życiem	
2014	Ja i moje ziomki	Dirt Video	Życie szalonym życiem	
2014	Rockafeller	Delaflow	Życie szalonym życiem	
2014	#Hot16Challenge	—	—	
2015	Szczęście	Delaflow	Życie szalonym życiem	
2015	MVP	9Liter Filmy	Życie szalonym życiem	
2017	Korzenie	Distort Media	Konsekwentnie	
2018	Ostatni drink	Mortvideo	Konsekwentnie	
2018	Coś ze mną nie tak	9Liter Filmy	Konsekwentnie	
2018	Traphouse	BREV#K.O Imperial	Konsekwentnie/Young Blood Mixtape	
