= Życie szalonym życiem =

Studio album by Z.B.U.K.U
- Released: 6 December 2014
- Recorded: 2013–2014
- Genre: hip-hop
- Label: Step Records

Z.B.U.K.U chronology
Że życie ma sens (2013)	Życie szalonym życiem (2014)	Kontrabanda: brat bratu bratem (2015)

Życie szalonym życiem (Polish pronunciation: [ˈʐɨ.t͡ɕɛ ʂaˈlɔ.nɨm ˈʐɨ.t͡ɕɛm]) is an album by Polish rapper Z.B.U.K.U. It contains 15 tracks. The official premiere took place on 6 December 2014. On 27 January 2016, the album was certified platinum. The album features several fellow rappers: Kobra, Śliwa, Sztoss, Rover, Big A, Kajman, Bezczel, Chada, PTP.

== Track listing ==
1. "Intro (Na raz)"
2. "Szczęście"
3. "List do..."
4. "Gierek"
5. "Rockafeller"
6. "La Vida Loca" (feat. Kobra)
7. "Skurwysyny 2"
8. "Młoda krew" (feat. Śliwa, Sztoss)
9. "Nie będziesz pierwszy" (feat. Rover)
10. "Mam tylko tyle" (feat. Big A)
11. "MVP"
12. "Ja i moje ziomki" (feat. Kajman, Bezczel, Chada)
13. "Potrzebuję tego" (feat. PTP)
14. "Na lepsze"
15. "Szczęście RMX"

== Music videos ==
- "Na lepsze"
- "Młoda krew"
- "Gierek"
- "Ja i moje ziomki"
- "Nie będziesz pierwszy"
