= Że życie ma sens =

Studio album by Z.B.U.K.U
- Released: 16 October 2013
- Genre: hip-hop
- Label: Step Records

Z.B.U.K.U chronology
Że życie ma sens (2013)	Życie szalonym życiem (2014)

Że życie ma sens (Polish pronunciation: [ʐɛ ˈʐɨ.t͡ɕɛ ma sɛns]) is an album by Polish rapper Z.B.U.K.U. It contains 15 tracks. The official premiere took place on 16 October 2013. On 14 January 2015, the album was certified gold. The album features several fellow rappers: Rover, Leszek, Bezczel, Bonson, Jopel.

== Track listing ==
1. "Siema brat" – 5:09
2. "HH rewolucja" – 3:29
3. "Torreador bitów" – 3:38
4. "To więcej niż muzyka" (feat. Rover) – 4:10
5. "Że życie ma sens" – 3:50
6. "Hip hop champions" (feat. Leszek) – 3:38
7. "Dupy kumple blanty rap" (feat. Bezczel, Bonson) – 4:56
8. "Skurwysyny" – 3:24
9. "Towar poszedł w obieg" – 3:39
10. "Pozostały wspomnienia" – 3:29
11. "Zaczarowane bębny" – 3:47
12. "Czuję to" – 4:14
13. "Miliony słów" (feat. Jopel) – 3:53
14. "Chcę żyć" – 4:14
15. "Witam cię w Polsce" – 4:21
