= Velký Klínovec =

Mountain in the Czech Republic

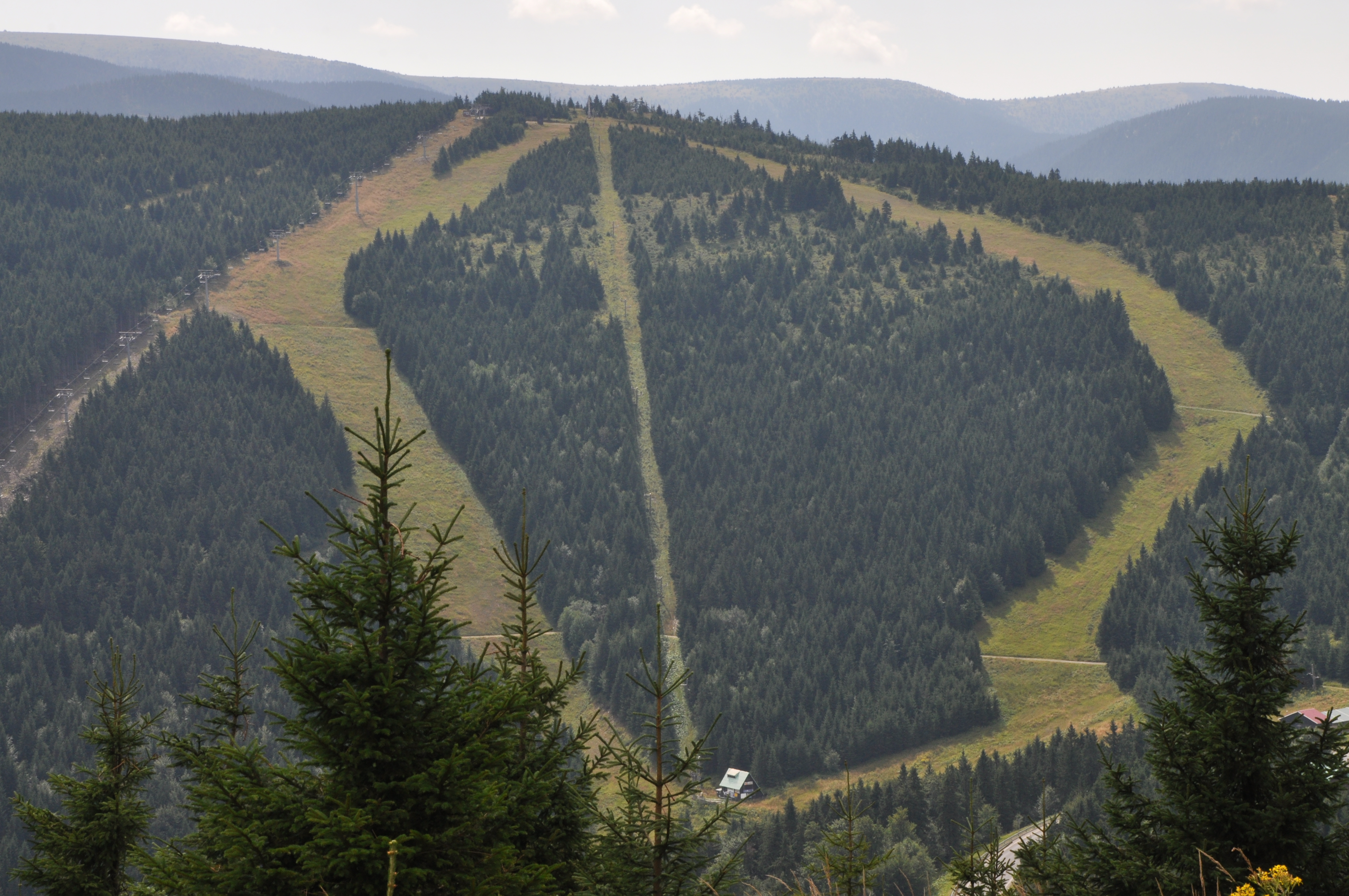
- View from the slope of Červená hora to Velký Klínovec with downhill skiing trails

Highest point
- Elevation: 1,167 m (3,829 ft)
- Prominence: 47 m (154 ft)
- Coordinates: 50°07′08.9″N 17°09′45.6″E

Geography
- Location within Czech Republic
- Location: Loučná nad Desnou, Czech Republic
- Parent range: Hrubý Jeseník

Velký Klínovec (formerly Klínovec; German: Käulig Wiese) is a mountain in the Hrubý Jeseník mountain range in the Czech Republic. It has an elevation of 1,167 m (3,829 ft) above sea level. It is located in the municipality of Loučná nad Desnou, near the historical border between Silesia and Moravia.

== Characteristics ==
=== Location ===
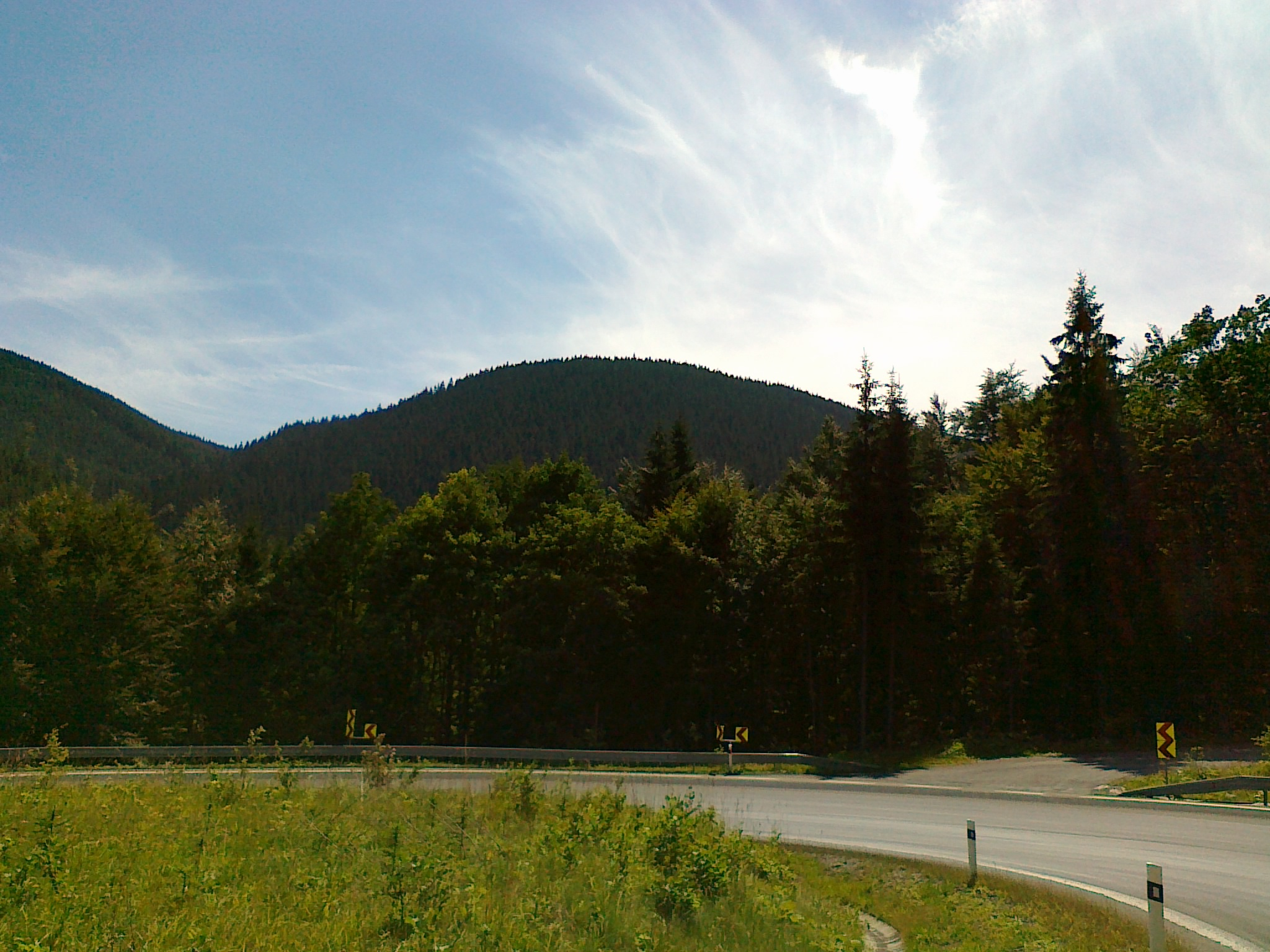
View from road no. 44 from Jeseník to Šumperk on the slope of Červená hora towards Velký Klínovec

Velký Klínovec is located slightly to the northwest of the centre of the entire Hrubý Jeseník range. It features a dome-shaped summit and lies within the northern area of the Hrubý Jeseník range in a subregion known as the Praděd Mountains. This summit is positioned along the main ridge, which extends from Červenohorské sedlo to Skřítek pass, between Výrovka (separated by Hřebenová pass) and Červená hora (separated by Červenohorské sedlo.

The mountain is easily recognizable from the west to the north directions, such as from the viewpoints in the Keprník Mountains, where the ski slopes on its side form an O shape. From other directions, it is less distinctive and harder to identify, such as from the road around the summit of Dlouhé stráně, where it appears to have a somewhat flattened ridge and is located between the peaks of Červená hora and Velký Klín. From the road encircling the summit of Praděd, it is difficult to recognize, as it is visible above Velký Jezerník.

Velký Klínovec is bordered by:

- to the northwest: Červenohorské sedlo pass and the valley of the Červenohorský potok;
- to the northeast: a valley of an unnamed stream, a tributary of the Červenohorský potok;
- to the east: Hřebenová pass;
- to the south: a valley of an unnamed stream, a tributary of the Divoká Desná river, and the valley of the Divoká Desná river;
- to the southwest and west: the valley of Divoký potok, flowing through Koutský žleb couloir.

Surrounding peaks include:

- to the northwest: Skalký u Červenohorského sedla–JZ, Skalký u Červenohorského sedla, Červená hora, and Červená hora–V;
- to the northeast: Velký Klín–JZ and Kamenný kostel;
- to the southeast: Výrovka, Nad Petrovkou, and Hřbety;
- to the south: Hřbety–JZ;
- to the southwest: Skalý (2) (Note: The indexed designation distinguishes it from another peak with the same name, Skály (1), located 4.5 km west of the town of Vrbno pod Pradědem in the same range.) and Suchá hora;
- to the west: Šindelná hora–JZ.

=== Slopes ===
Within the mountain, four main slopes can be distinguished:

- northwestern slope, extending from the summit to the Červenohorské sedlo pass (with most of the skiing trails);
- northern slope, located between the Červenohorský potok stream and an unnamed stream originating at the Hřebenová pass;
- eastern slope: short slope from the summit to the Hřebenová pass;
- southwestern slope, extending from the summit to the village of Kouty nad Desnou, situated between the Koutský žleb couloir and a stream originating at the Hřebenová pass (longest slope, approximately 2.5 km in length).

All types of forestation can be found here: spruce forest, mixed forest, (Note: The forest stand of the entire Jeseníky Protected Landscape Area includes: European spruce 84%, European beech 10%, European larch 1.5%, sycamore maple 1.1%, birch 1%, common alder 0.8%, dwarf mountain pine 0.4%, grey alder 0.3%, (European silver fir, European ash, and linden) 0.2%, Scotch pine 0.1%, and others (Pinus mugo, oak, hornbeam, Norway maple, elm, rowan, green alder, aspen, poplar, and goat willow) 0.2%.) and deciduous forest, with spruce forest predominating. The northern and southwestern slopes feature mixed forests alongside the spruce forest, and as altitude decreases on the southwestern slope, deciduous forests also appear. Nearly all slopes show significant variability in forest coverage, with clearings, ski trails, associated ski lifts, and large meadows. Along the southwestern slope near the Koutský žleb couloir, runs a 22 kV overhead power line. Approximately 750 meters west of the summit, near the crest of the southwestern slope, there are isolated rocky outcrops and a group of rocks at elevations from 1,050 to 1,080 meters above sea level.

The slopes generally have gentle and varied inclines. The average slope gradient ranges from 5° (eastern slope) to 14° (northwestern slope). The weighted arithmetic mean slope gradient for the entire mountain is around 12°. The maximum average gradient on the southwestern slope near the bend before the Červenohorské sedlo pass on route 44 does not exceed 45° over a 50-meter stretch. The slopes are crisscrossed by a network of roads (e.g., Miliónová cesta) and generally unmarked, sparse paths.

The southwestern slope is traversed by the serpentine national road 44 from Šumperk to Jeseník. This road is unique in its course, originally laid out in the 19th century to connect with the developing tourist base at Červenohorské sedlo pass. It was later asphalted in the 20th century and modernized and repaired between 2014 and 2016. To cover a straight-line distance of 2.6 km with an elevation difference of 405 meters (from the bridge in Kouty nad Desnou at 603 m above sea level to the Červenohorské sedlo pass at 1,008 m above sea level), a road 7.7 km long had to be built to moderate the slope gradient. The road includes nine road loops at elevations of 609, 620, 699, 770, 800, 832, 865, 897, and 922 m above sea level. The road is secured with guardrails along the mountain side, offering views towards many nearby peaks such as Dlouhé stráně, Medvědí hora, Suchá hora, and, at higher elevations, the tower on Praděd.

=== Summit ===
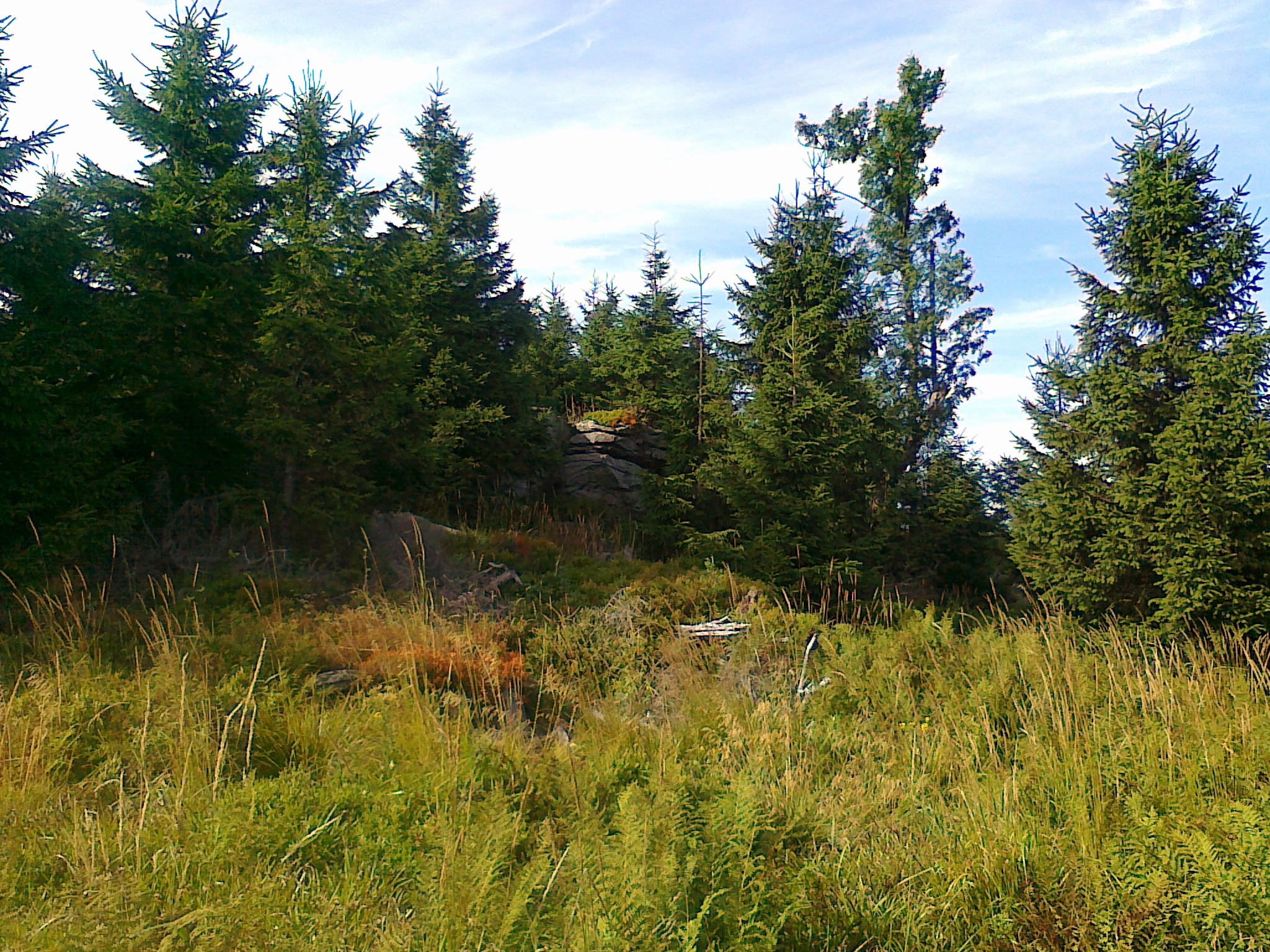
View of the rocky summit of Velký Klínovec

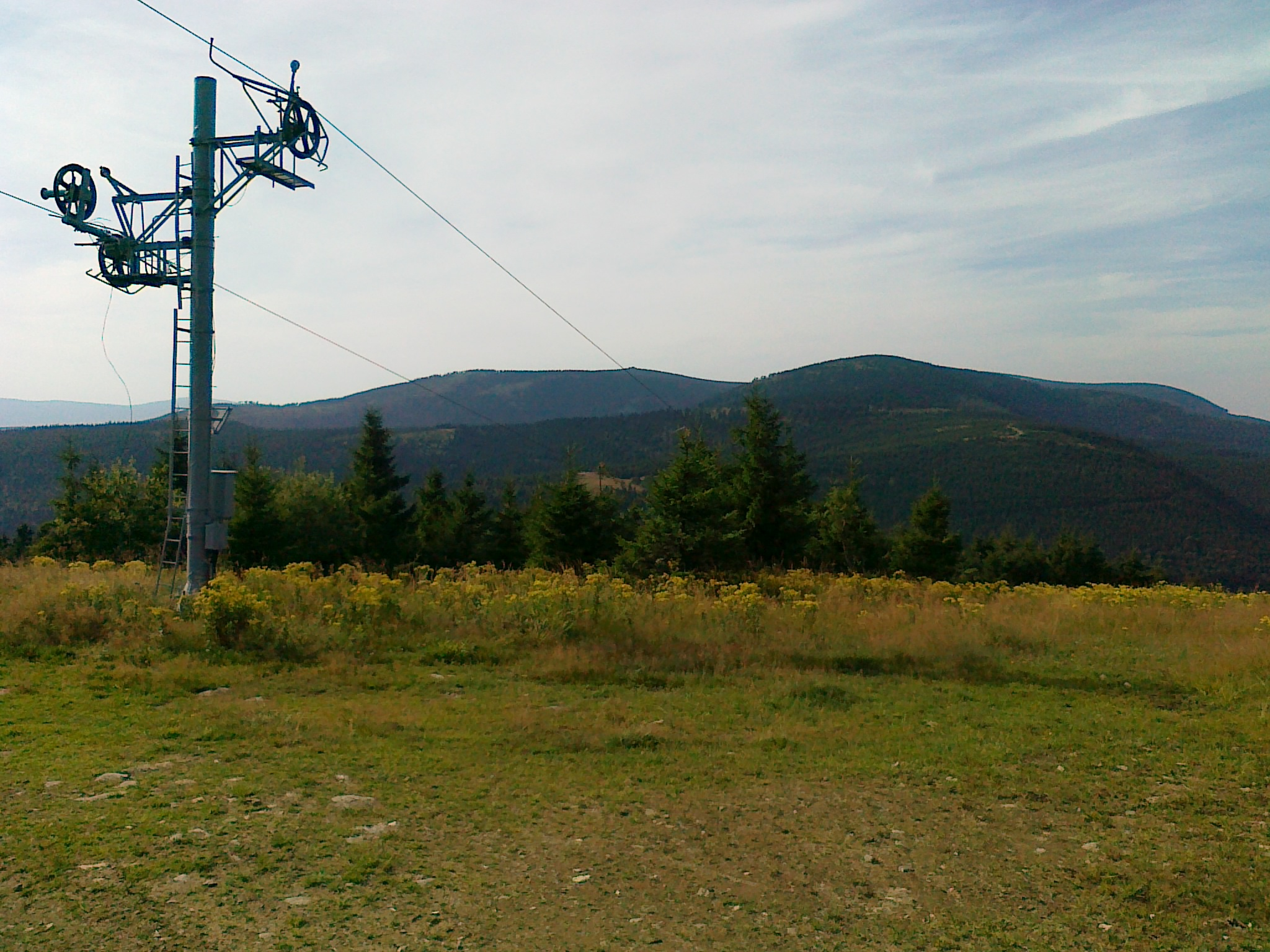
View from the ski trails' starting area towards Klínová hora, Spálený vrch, Vozka, Červená hora and Žalostná

Velký Klínovec is a mountain with a single summit. The summit area is forested with spruce, with clearings covered in alpine grass and dotted with small rocky outcrops. The summit area contains a triangulation station marked on geodetic maps as number 7, with an elevation of 1,163.80 m above sea level and coordinates 50°07′07.96″N 17°09′44.81″E, located about 30 m southwest of the summit. The summit features a rocky outcrop, which is a limited viewpoint offering restricted views, including towards Praděd mountain. This outcrop is surrounded by forest, which over time grows taller and further limits the view. According to the publisher=State Administration of Land Surveying and Cadastre, the highest point of the mountain is the summit, with an elevation of 1,166.9 m above sea level and coordinates 50°07′08.9″N 17°09′45.6″E. Close to the summit's rocky outcrop is the starting area for the ski trails, providing perspectives on the peaks of the Keprník Mountains: Ucháč, Černá stráň, Klínová hora, Spálený vrch, Vozka, Červená hora, and Žalostná, and Točník.

=== Geology ===
Geologically, the Velký Klínovec massif belongs to the unit known as the Vrbno layers and is composed of metamorphic rocks, mainly phyllonites (biotite, chlorite, and muscovite), phyllites, gneisses (plagioclase), amphibolites, porphyroids, stromatites, schists (graphite), greenschist, quartzite, and sedimentary rocks, mainly limestone and meta-conglomerates.

=== Waters ===
The mountain lies on the European watershed, with the northern slope draining into the Baltic Sea basin (Oder river basin) and the southwestern slope draining into the Black Sea basin (Danube river basin). Several short unnamed streams, tributaries of the Divoká Desná river, originate on the southwestern slope. Near I/44 road, about 1.6 km southwest of the summit (southwestern slope), at an elevation of about 681 m above sea level, there is a built spring called Studánka pod Červenohorským sedlem. Additionally, at the foot of the southwestern slope, near the Divoká Desná river, there is an oval pond about 90 m long and a rectangular water reservoir near the buildings of the Kouty nad Desnou settlement, close to the flowing Divoký potok stream. Due to the relatively gentle slopes, there are no waterfalls or cascades on the mountain.

== Nature protection ==
The entire mountain is located within the Jeseníky Protected Landscape Area, established to protect rock formations, soil, and plant life, as well as rare animal species. There are no nature reserves or other natural monuments on the slopes. Additionally, no educational trails have been designated on the mountain.

== Tourism ==
=== Hiking trails ===
The Czech Tourist Club has marked four hiking trails on and around Velký Klínovec:

Červenohorské sedlo – Velký Klínovec – Hřebenová pass – Výrovka – Sedlo pod Malým Jezerníkem pass – Malý Jezerník – Velký Jezerník – Sedlo Velký Jezerník pass – Švýcárna mountain hut – Praděd – U Barborky pass – Petrovy kameny – Ovčárna – Sedlo u Petrových kamenů pass – Vysoká hole – Vysoká hole–JZ – Kamzičník – Velký Máj – Sedlo nad Malým kotlem pass – Jelení hřbet – Jelení studánka – Sedlo pod Jelení studánkou pass – Jelenka – Ostružná – Rýmařov

Červenohorské sedlo – Velký Klínovec – Výrovka Mountain – Malý Jezerník Mountain – Kamzík

Filipovice – Jeřáb – Mariin pramen spring – Velký Klín – Velký Klínovec – Červenohorské sedlo – Kouty nad Desnou – Hučivá Desná valley – Sedlo pod Vřesovkou pass – Kamenne okno – Červená hora – Bílý sloup

Kouty nad Desnou – Hřbety – Nad Petrovkou – Kamzík – Velký Jezerník – Sedlo Velký Jezerník pass – Švýcárna mountain hut – Praděd – U Barborky pass – Petrovy kameny – Ovčárna – Karlova Studánka

=== Cycling routes ===
Three cycling routes are marked around Velký Klínovec:

Červenohorské sedlo – Velký Klínovec – Výrovka – Kamzík – Velký Jezerník – Sedlo Velký Jezerník pass – Malý Děd – Švýcárna mountain hut – Praděd – U Barborky pass – Petrovy kameny – Ovčárna – Hvězda pass

Videlské sedlo – Vysoký vodopád nature reserve – Malý Děd – Velký Jezerník – Malý Jezerník – Výrovka – Velký Klín – Jeřáb – Velký Klínovec – Červenohorské sedlo

Přemyslov – Černá stráň – Hučivá Desná valley – Červená hora – Šindelná hora – Suchá hora – Kouty nad Desnou – Hřbety – Nad Petrovkou – Petrovka

==== Road climbs ====
A popular road climb runs along the southwestern slope on road no. 44 to Červenohorské sedlo, favored by cyclists and motorcyclists:

Climb from Loučná nad Desnou (length: 11.8 km, elevation gain: 506 m, average gradient: 4.3%, with 9 switchbacks)

=== Ski trails ===
In snowy periods, cross-country ski trails follow the hiking and cycling routes, including the so-called Jesenická magistrála:

Drátovna – Jeřáb – Mariin pramen spring – Velký Klín – Pod Velkým Klínem – Velký Klín–JZ – Velký Klínovec – Červenohorské sedlo

Videlské sedlo – Vysoký vodopád nature reserve – Malý Děd – Velký Jezerník – Velký Klín – Jeřáb – Velký Klínovec – Červenohorské sedlo

Six downhill ski trails with corresponding lifts are established on Velký Klínovec, with round signs at the summit indicating the color (difficulty) and number of the trail:

Main downhill ski trails with lifts from Velký Klínovec
Number	Trail and name	Trail length (meters)	Elevation gain (meters)	Lift type	Lift length (meters)
1	1	750	190	T-bar lift	750
2	1a	1,250	290	4-chair lift	1,050
3	2	900	180	T-bar lift	750
4	2a	1,350	290	4-chair lift	1,050
5	3	420	90	T-bar lift	450
6	3a	190	35	T-bar lifts	200 and 60
