= Ucháč =

Mountain in the Czech Republic

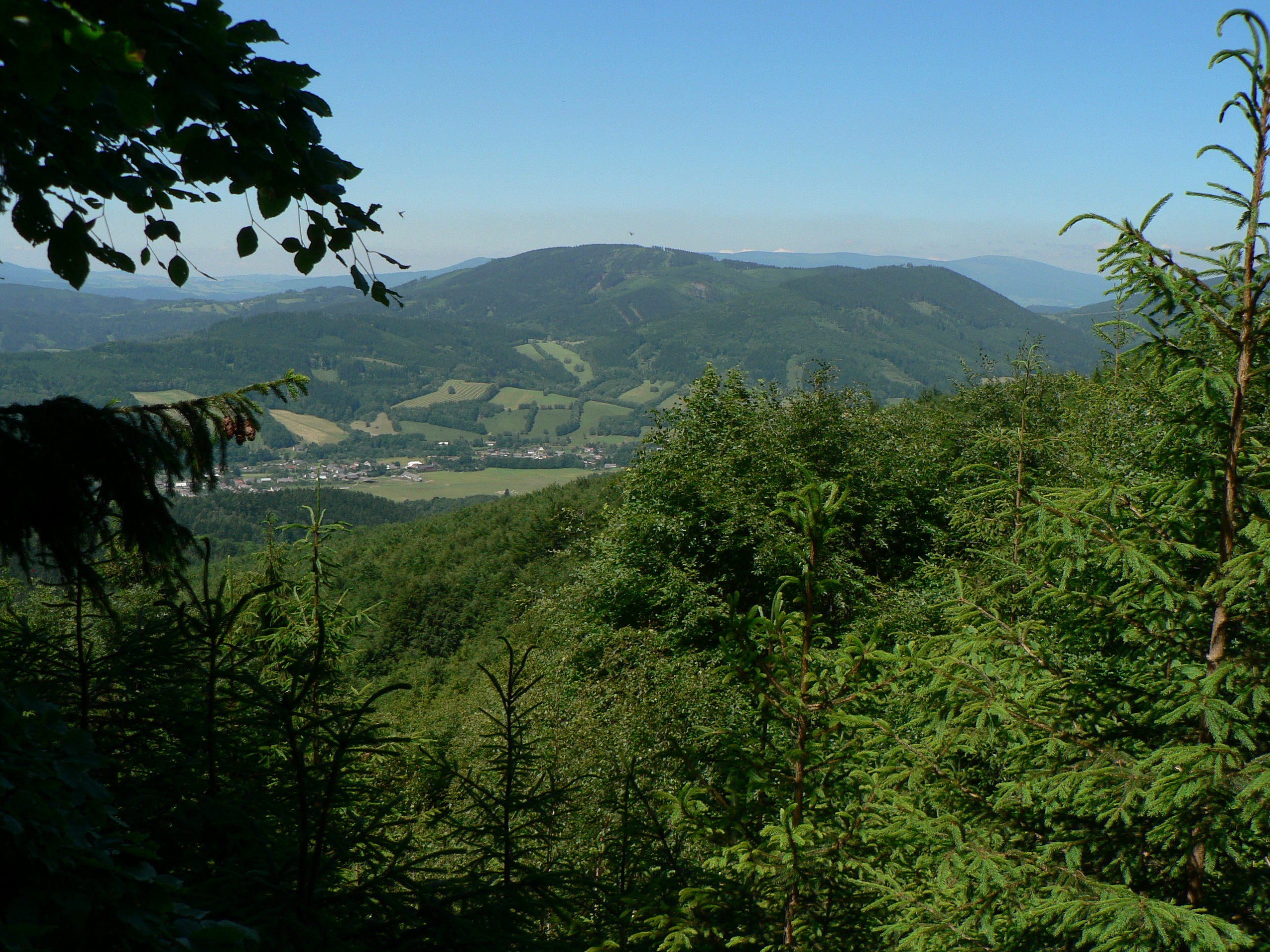
- View from the slope of the Mravenečník mountain to the Ucháč, Tři kameny and Jelení skalka mountains (below Loučná nad Desnou)

Highest point
- Elevation: 1,010 m (3,310 ft)
- Prominence: 245 m (804 ft)
- Isolation: 3 km (1.9 mi)
- Coordinates: 50°5′35″N 17°2′54″E

Geography
- Location within Czech Republic
- Location: Loučná nad Desnou, Czech Republic
- Parent range: Hrubý Jeseník

Ucháč (German: Ohren Berg) is a mountain in the Hrubý Jeseník mountain range in the Czech Republic. It has an elevation of 1,010 m (3,310 ft) above sea level. It is located in the municipality of Loučná nad Desnou, near the settlement of Přemyslov.

Ucháč is the westernmost summit over 1,000 m above sea level of the mountain range.

== Characteristics ==
=== Location ===
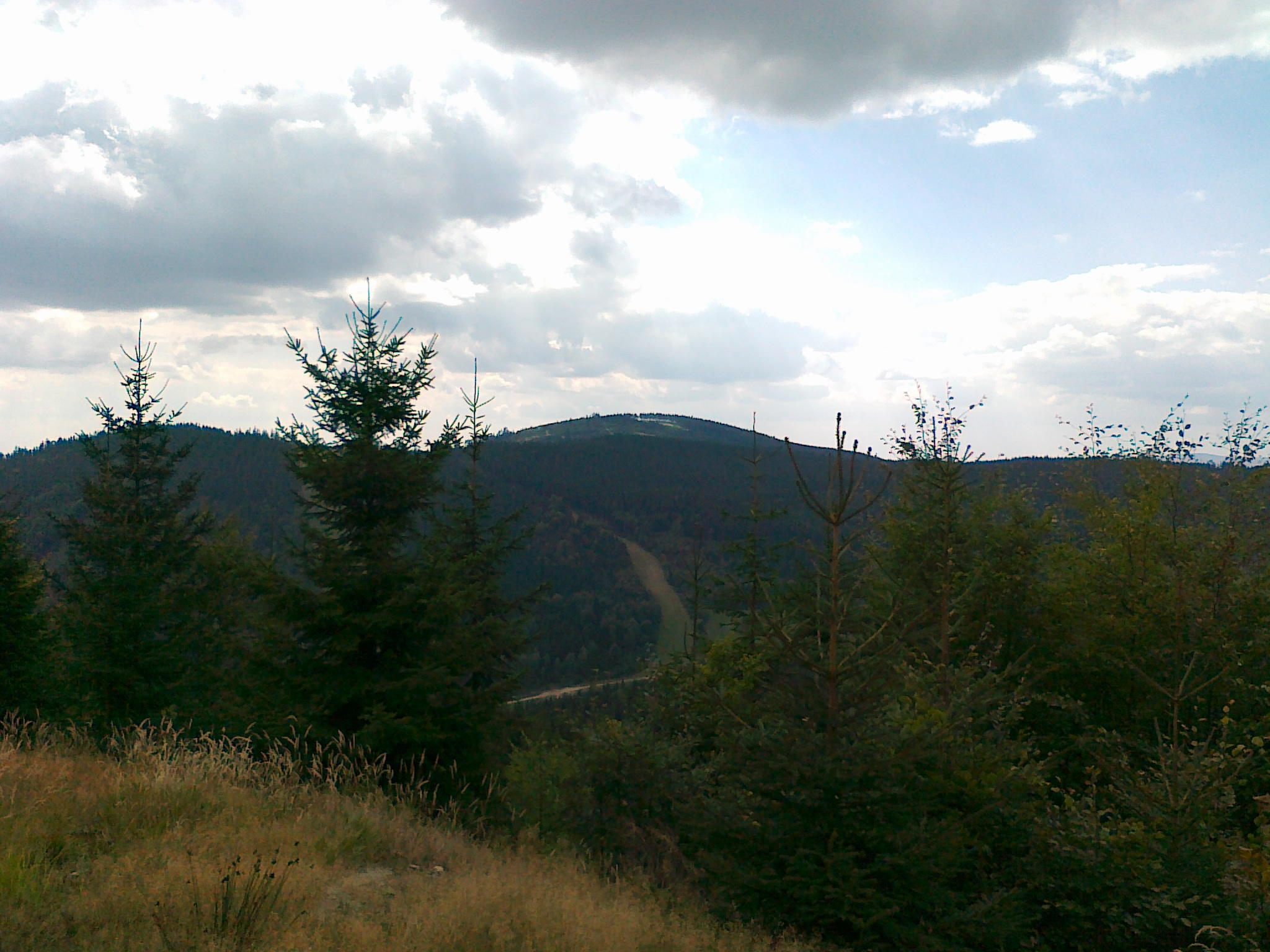
View from the slope of Černá stráň to the summits of Jelení skalka, Ucháč (below secondary summit Ucháč–SV) and Tři kameny

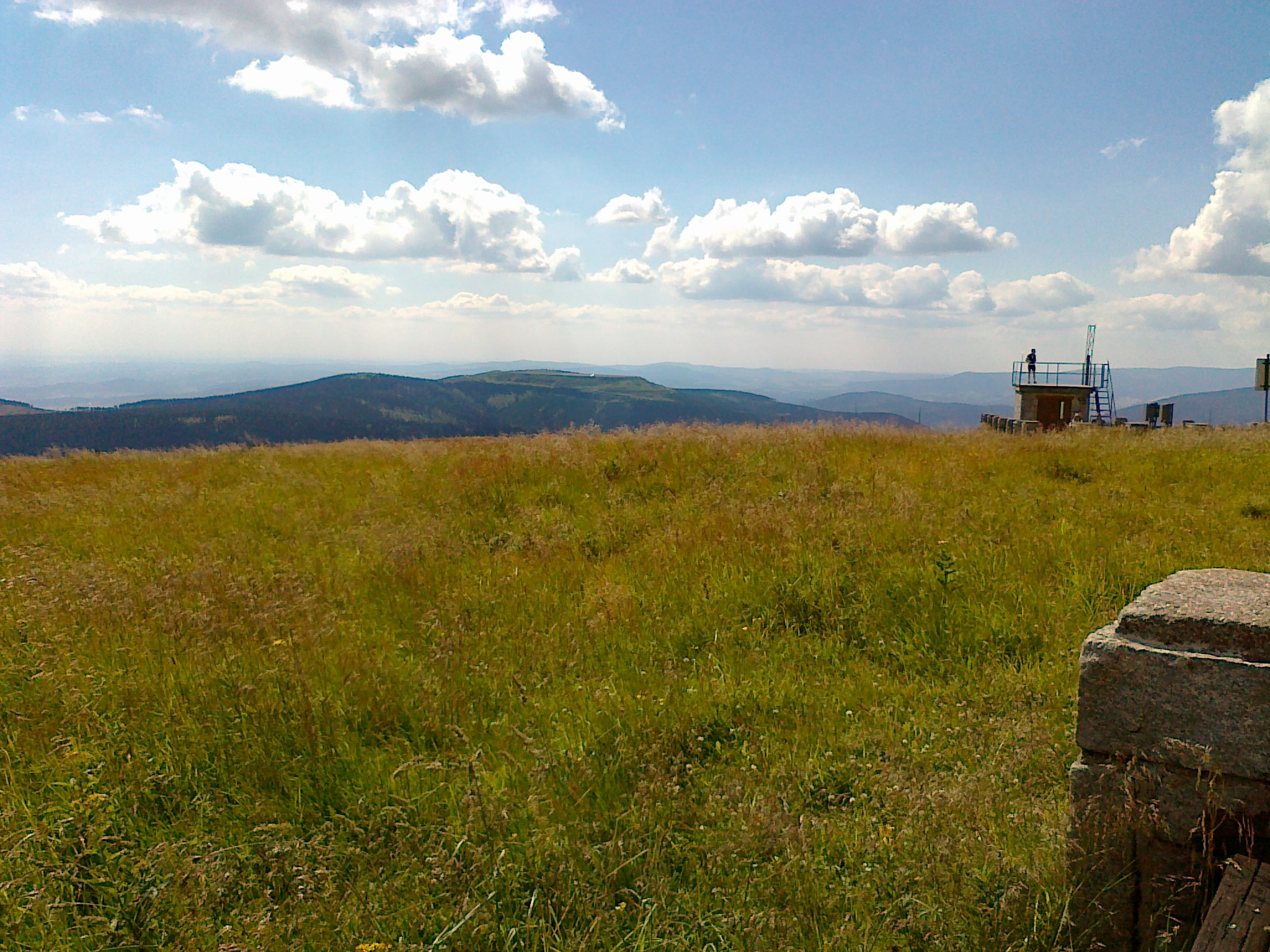
View from the top of Praděd to Vřesník, Dlouhé stráně (with the summit of Mravenečník above it), Kamenec (1) and Medvědí hora (with the summit of Ucháč faintly visible)

Ucháč is situated in the western part of the Hrubý Jeseník range, in the microregion called the Keprník Mountains, near the border with the neighboring range called Hanušovice Highlands. A characteristic feature of the mountain is the presence of two summits on its summit dome, located less than 200 metres apart, both having the same height. Due to its height, Ucháč is a mountain that is difficult to recognize compared to the significantly higher mountains of this range. From the nearby I/44 road (from Jeseník to Šumperk) and the road from Rejhotice to Nové Losiny, it is practically invisible. From the Přemyslovské sedlo pass, only the slope of the secondary summit Ucháč–SV can be seen. The mountain is recognizable and visible from, among other places, the road encircling the summit area of Praděd (visible above the line of sight to Medvědí hora) and from another characteristic viewpoint – the road encircling the summit of Dlouhé stráně (visible above the line of sight to Kamenec (1)). (Note: The designation is indexed to distinguish it from two other peaks in the same range with the same name: Kamenec (2), located 3.3 km southeast of the Skřítek pass, and Kamenec (3), located 1.7 km east of the village of Bělá pod Pradědem.)

The mountain is bounded by:

- to the northwest, the valley of the Sklená voda stream, flowing in the valley called Sklenská dolina;
- to the north, a minor pass with an elevation of 897 metres towards Tři kameny mountain;
- to the northeast, the valley of the Přemyslovský potok stream and a pass with an elevation of 915 metres towards the summit of Jelení skalka;
- to the east and southeast, the valley of the Losinka stream;
- to the south, Bukový vrch and the valley of the Medvědí potok stream;
- to the southwest, a pass with an elevation of 744 metres towards the summit of Pekařovský vrch–V;
- to the west, the valley of an unnamed stream, a tributary of Sklená voda.

Surrounding peaks include:

- to the north, Tři kameny;
- to the northeast, Černá stráň–ZSZ, Černá stráň, and Jelení skalka;
- to the east, Jelení skok;
- to the southeast, Loveč–S (a peak in the Hanušovice Highlands range) and Bukový vrch;
- to the south, an unnamed peak with an elevation of 635 metres;
- to the southwest, an unnamed peak with an elevation of 655 metres, Studenec, Pekařovský vrch, and Pekařovský vrch–V;
- to the west, an unnamed peak with an elevation of 673 metres;
- to the northwest, Dlouhá stráň (the last seven peaks are in the Hanušovice Highlands range), Sklenský vrch, Sklenský vrch–V, and Tři kameny–SZ.

=== Slopes ===
On the mountain, seven main slopes can be distinguished:

- northern
- northeastern
- eastern
- southeastern
- southern, called Nad Pekařskou cestou
- southwestern, called Javoří
- western, called Sklená and Na Ucháči

All types of forestation can be found here: spruce forest, mixed forest, (Note: The forest stand of the entire Jeseníky Protected Landscape Area includes: European spruce 84%, European beech 10%, European larch 1.5%, sycamore maple 1.1%, birch 1%, common alder 0.8%, dwarf mountain pine 0.4%, grey alder 0.3%, (European silver fir, European ash, and linden) 0.2%, Scotch pine 0.1%, and others (Pinus mugo, oak, hornbeam, Norway maple, elm, rowan, green alder, aspen, poplar, and goat willow) 0.2%.) and deciduous forest, with mixed forest being predominant. Almost all slopes, except the northern one, are covered with dense mixed forest and spruce forest, with areas of deciduous forest appearing as elevation decreases. At the foot of the northeastern, southeastern, southwestern, and western slopes, there are meadows. All slopes are characterized by significant variability in forest height, with banded clearings, glades, thinnings, and bare areas. The southeastern, southern, and southwestern slopes feature isolated larger rock outcrops, and on the southeastern slope, there is a rock group called Bukovická skalka. Additionally, small areas of boulder fields can be found on the southeastern and southern slopes. At the foot of the southeastern slope, near the settlement of Bukovice, there is a 22 kV overhead power line.

The slopes have relatively uniform, generally gentle, and slightly varied inclines. The average slope gradient ranges from 8° (northeastern slope) to 15° (southeastern slope). The average gradient of all slopes (weighted arithmetic mean of slope gradients) is approximately 11°. The maximum average slope of the southern slope, near the red tourist trail and the red cycling trail, at an elevation of around 740 m above sea level, does not exceed 30° over a 50 m stretch. The slopes are covered with a network of roads (e.g., Pekařovská cesta) and generally unmarked paths and tracks.

==== Bukovická skalka ====
On the southeastern slope, about 850 m southeast of the summit, at an elevation of approximately 825 m above sea level, there is a rock group called Bukovická skalka (or Skály nad Bukovicemi), with an elevation of 841 m above sea level, near the red tourist trail. The rocks are composed of gneisses with quartz veins. The highest wall of the rock group is about 15 m high. It is partially forested, predominantly with spruce.

Access to the rocks is from the red tourist trail, from which a path leads about 150 m.

=== Main summit ===
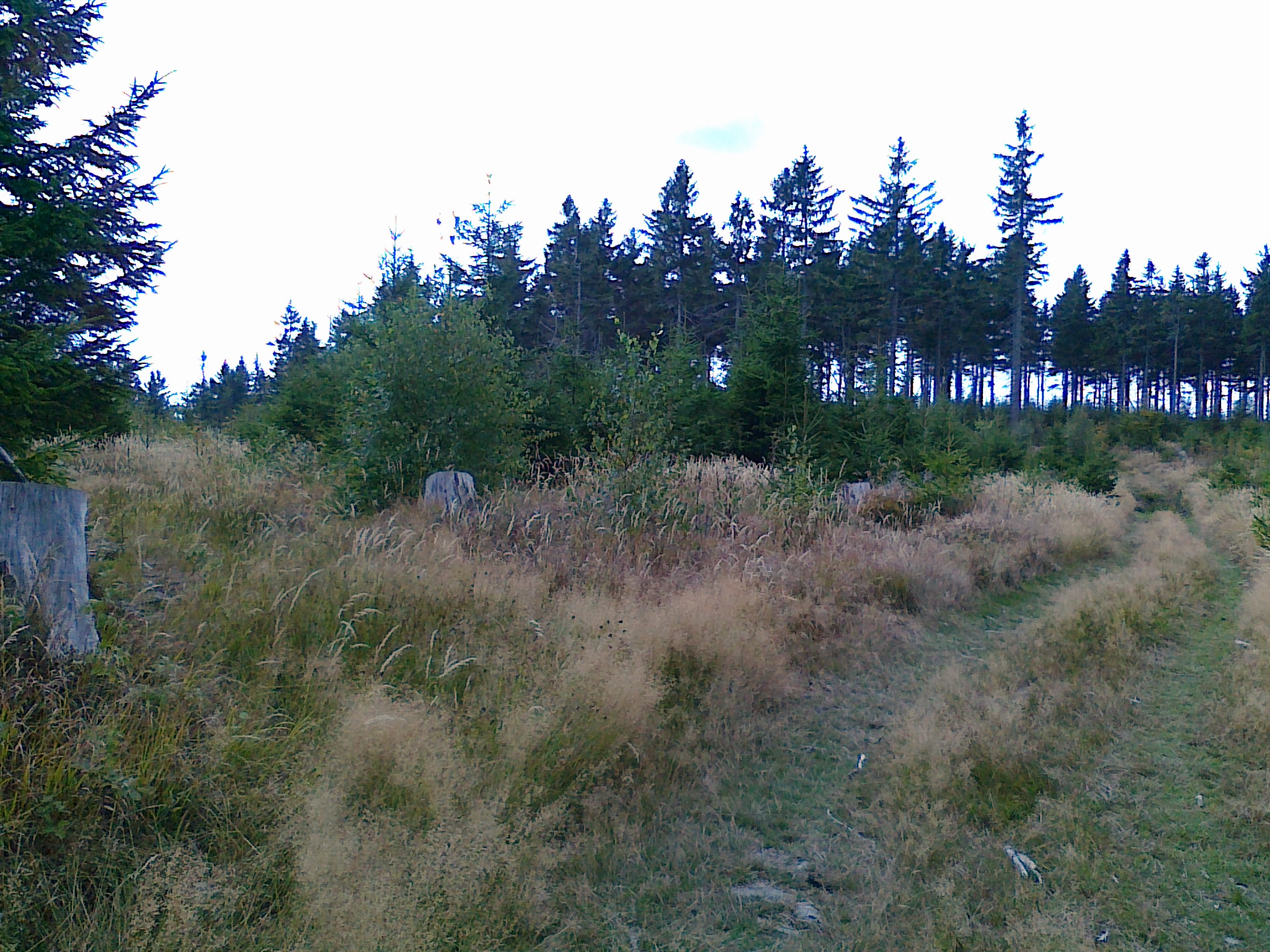
Summit area of Ucháč

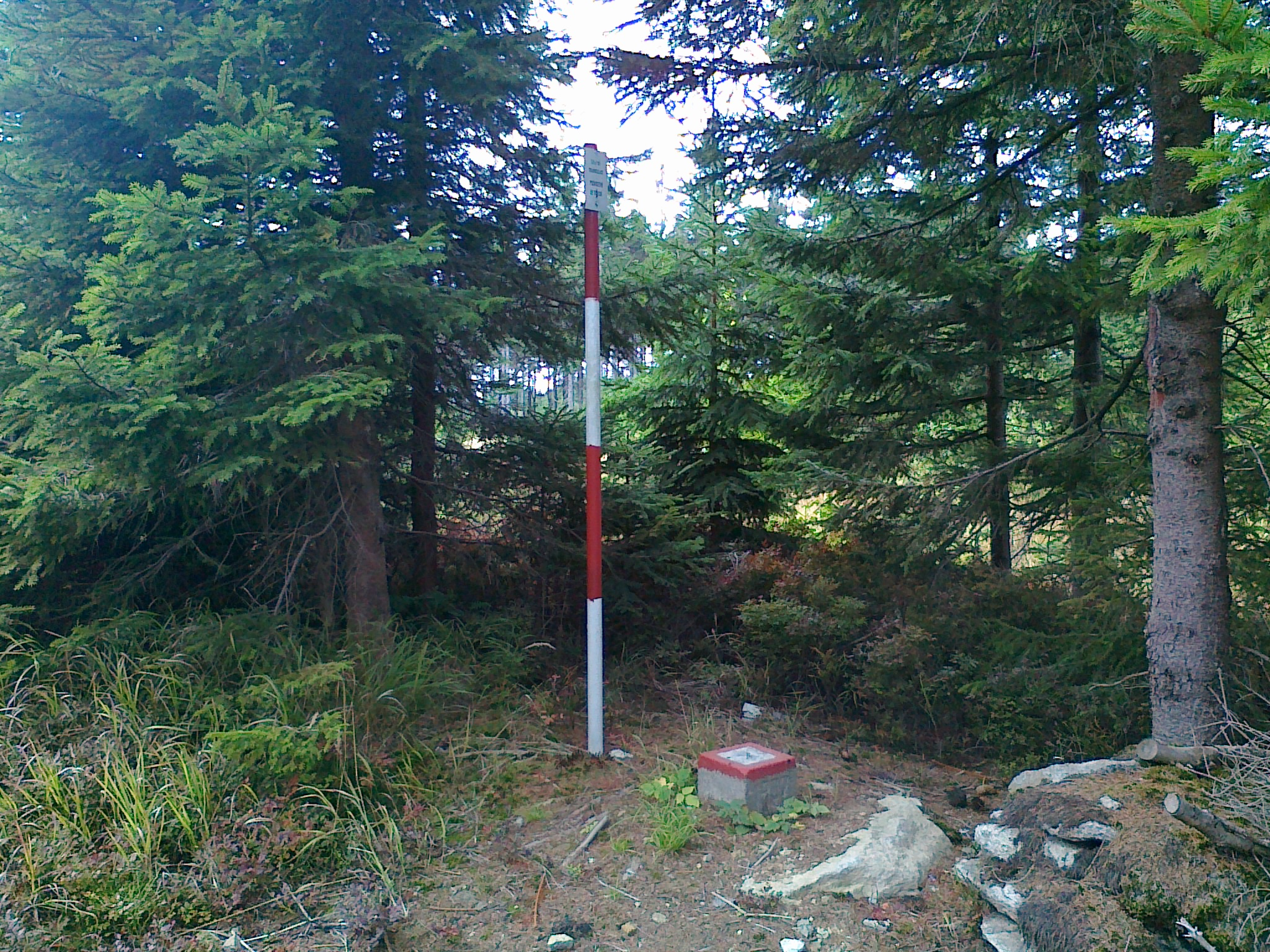
Triangulation station on the summit area of Ucháč

The summit of Ucháč is a triple summit. No marked tourist trail leads directly to the main summit. The main road connecting all the main and secondary summits passes through the summit area. The summit is located in a partially cleared spruce forest, covered with alpine grass. Due to the forest cover, the summit area is not a viewpoint. On the summit area, there is a triangulation station established in 1937, marked on geodetic maps with the number 16, at an elevation of 1,008.53 metres above sea level and geographic coordinates 50°05′35.11″N 17°02′52.65″E, with a nearby mounted steel post painted in alternating horizontal white and red stripes, warning against its destruction, with a plaque reading Státní triangulace Poškození se trestá (English: State triangulation station. Damage is punishable), located about 30 m northwest of the summit. The State Administration of Land Surveying and Cadastre lists the highest point of the mountain – the summit – at an elevation of 1,009.6 m above sea level and geographic coordinates 50°05′34.8″N 17°02′54.0″E.

Access to the summit is from the blue tourist trail, from which an unmarked road encircles the summit dome from the pass between the main summit and the secondary one, Ucháč–SV. One must proceed to the right for about 630 m, reach a slope clearing, turn left, and then continue uphill for about 300 m to reach the summit area.

=== Secondary summits ===
Besides the main summit, two secondary summits can be distinguished:

Secondary summits of Ucháč
Number	Summit	Elevation (metres above sea level)	Distance from main summit (kilometres)	Coordinates
1	Ucháč–JZ	1,138	0.87 southeast	50°05′32.8″N 17°02′45.5″E
2	Ucháč–SV	1,056	1.74 northwest	50°05′59.8″N 17°03′17.6″E

=== Geology ===
Geologically, the Ucháč massif belongs to a unit known as the Keprník Dome and is composed of metamorphic rocks, mainly gneisses, orthogneisses (biotites), mylonites, blasto-mylonites, and igneous rocks, primarily meta-granites. The shape of the massif and the presence of granite suggest a volcanic origin.

=== Waters ===
Ucháč summit

Climate chart (precipitation, max. and min. temperature)
J	F	M	A	M	J	J	A	S	O	N	D
58 −3 −7	50 −2 −7	61 3 −4	61 9 0	103 14 5	103 16 8	109 19 10	90 19 10	66 15 6	43 10 2	56 3 −2	60 −2 −6
- █ Average max. and min. temperatures in °C
- █ Precipitation totals in mm
- Source: Climate Ucháč. meteoblue.com
Imperial conversion
J	F	M	A	M	J	J	A	S	O	N	D
2.3 27 19	2 28 19	2.4 37 25	2.4 48 32	4.1 57 41	4.1 61 46	4.3 66 50	3.5 66 50	2.6 59 43	1.7 50 36	2.2 37 28	2.4 28 21
- █ Average max. and min. temperatures in °F
- █ Precipitation totals in inches

Ucháč is situated to the southwest of the European watershed, and thus belongs to the Black Sea drainage basin. Waters from this part of the Hrubý Jeseník flow into the Danube river basin, which is part of the Black Sea watershed. Nearby streams and mountain brooks, such as Přemyslovský potok, Losinka, Medvědí potok and Sklená voda, all contribute to this drainage system. The Přemyslovský potok stream originates on the northeastern slope of the mountain, along with several unnamed short streams that flow into Losinka and Medvědí potok. Additionally, about 1.4 km southwest of the summit, at an elevation of approximately 750 m above sea level, there is a spring known as Studánka U Chaty, located near the green tourist trail. Due to the relatively gentle slopes of the mountain, there are no waterfalls or cascades in the area.

== Nature protection ==
The area where Ucháč is located is the only one in the Hrubý Jeseník that does not fall within the protected area known as the Jeseníky Protected Landscape Area. The boundary of this protected area runs north of the mountain, near the road from Rejhotice to Nové Losiny. At the foot of the northeastern slope of the mountain, near the road from Rejhotice to Nové Losiny, and outside the Jeseníky Protected Landscape Area, the Přemyslovské Sedlo Nature Reserve (Czech: Přírodní Rezervace Přemyslovské Sedlo) has been established. There are no designated educational trails or natural monuments in Ucháč area.

=== Přemyslovské Sedlo Nature Reserve ===
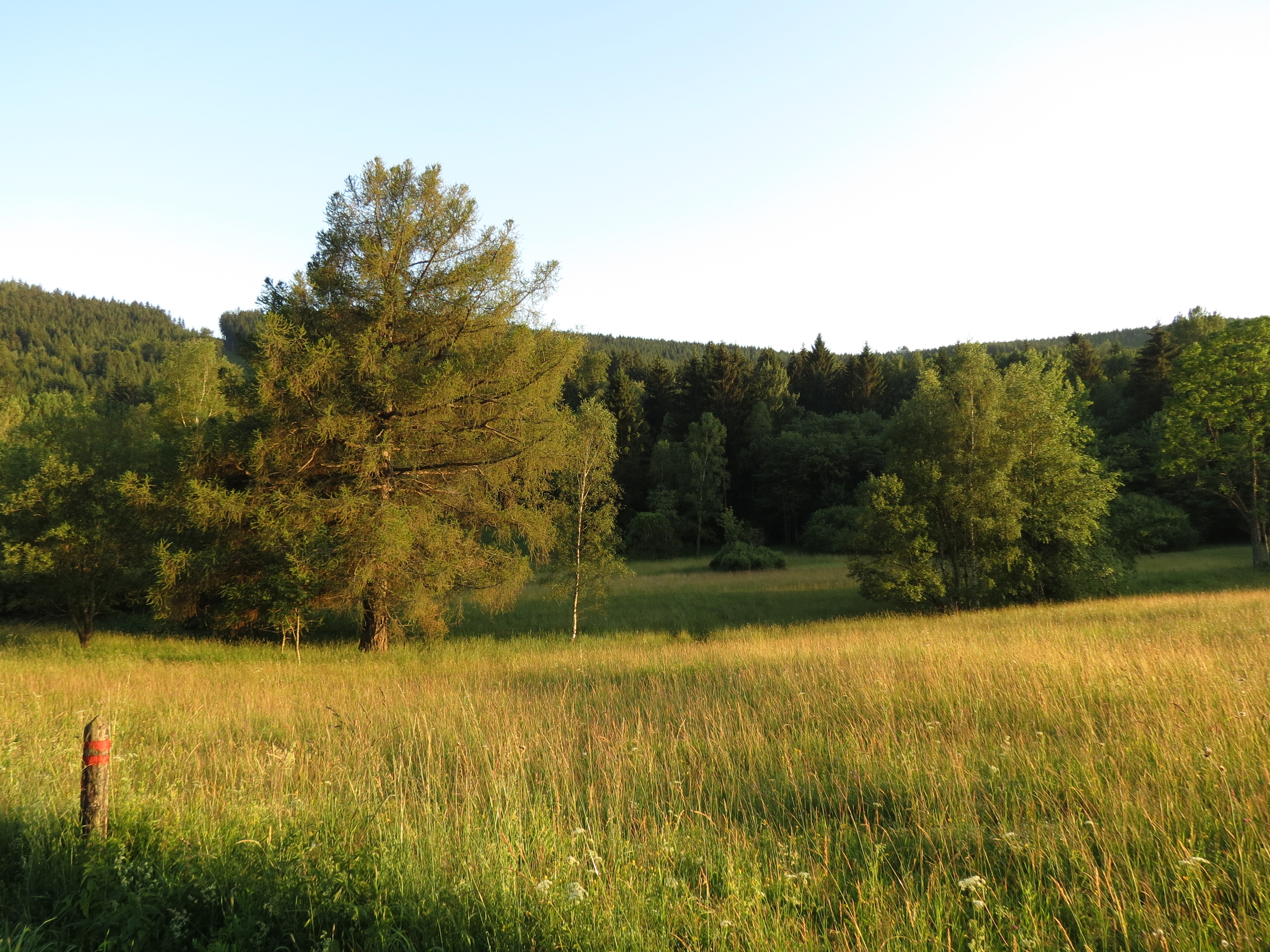
View of the Přemyslovské Sedlo Nature Reserve

The Přemyslovské Sedlo Nature Reserve is located at elevations between 730 and 768 m above sea level, at the foot of the northeastern slope of the mountain, around the Přemyslovský potok. This is a small area covering 5.29 ha, with an additional 1.65 ha of protective buffer zone. It is situated approximately 12.4 km northwest of the Praděd summit and about 1.7 km northeast of the Ucháč summit. Established on 12 February 2001, the reserve aims to protect peat and wet meadows that host protected plant species. Roughly half of the reserve is forested, while the other half comprises protected meadows. The reserve is not open to tourists, as there are no educational trails within its area.

== Tourism ==
=== Hiking trails ===
The Czech Tourist Club has marked three hiking trails in the area of the mountain:

Loučná nad Desnou – Loveč – Jelení skok – Ucháč – Pekařovský vrch – Studenec – Žárovec – Pršná – Hynčice nad Moravou – Hanušovice

Kouty nad Desnou – Černá stráň – Přemyslov – Jelení skok – Jelení skalka – Ucháč – Tři kameny summit – Nové Losiny – Černá stráň – Branná

Tři kameny (útulna) – Ucháč – Pekařovský vrch – Studenec – Chlum – Chmelný vrch – Křížový vrch – Velké Losiny

=== Cycling routes ===
Two cycling routes pass through the slopes of Ucháč:

Loučná nad Desnou – Seč – Čepel – Mravenečník – Medvědí hora – Kamenec (1) – Dlouhé stráně – Velká Jezerná – Divoká Desná river valley – Kouty nad Desnou – Černá stráň – Přemyslovské sedlo pass – Tři kameny – Ucháč – Jelení skok – Loveč – Lískovec – Loučná nad Desnou

Pekařovská cesta – Pekařovský vrch – Studenec – Račinka brook valley – Velké Losiny – Smrčná – Pod Lískovcem

=== Ski trails ===
During the snowy periods, the hiking and cycling routes, as well as other roads, are used for cross-country skiing trails. Additionally, the only downhill ski trail on the northeastern slope of the mountain is marked as Sjezdovka Dětská I (3), which is part of the Ski Areál Přemyslov ski resort. The other downhill trails in this resort, numbered 1 and 2, are located on the slope of the neighboring Jelení skalka mountain.

No. 3: an easy trail of 200 metres with a T-bar lift.
