= Medvědí hora =

Mountain in the Czech Republic

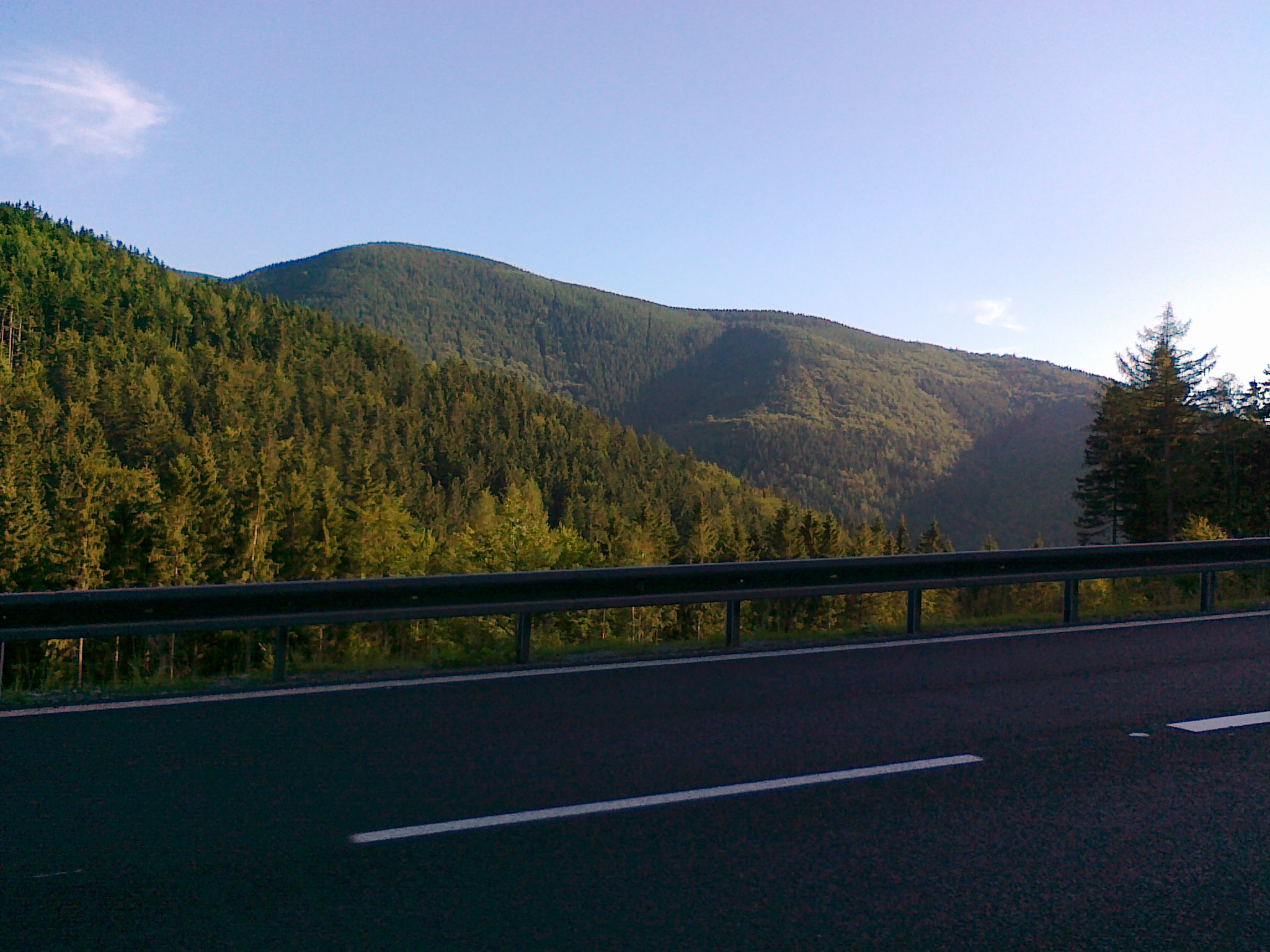
- View from the I/44 road on the slope of Velký Klínovec mountain to the top of Medvědí hora and Dlouhý vrch (on the left, the slope of Hřbety–JZ mountain)

Highest point
- Elevation: 1,164 m (3,819 ft)
- Prominence: 4 m (13 ft)
- Coordinates: 50°5′16″N 17°8′50″E

Geography
- Location within Czech Republic
- Location: Loučná nad Desnou
- Parent range: Hrubý Jeseník

Medvědí hora (formerly also known as Medvězí; German: Bärenherd) is a mountain in the Hrubý Jeseník mountain range in the Czech Republic. It has an elevation of 1,164 m (3,819 ft) above sea level. It is located in the municipality of Loučná nad Desnou.

== Location ==
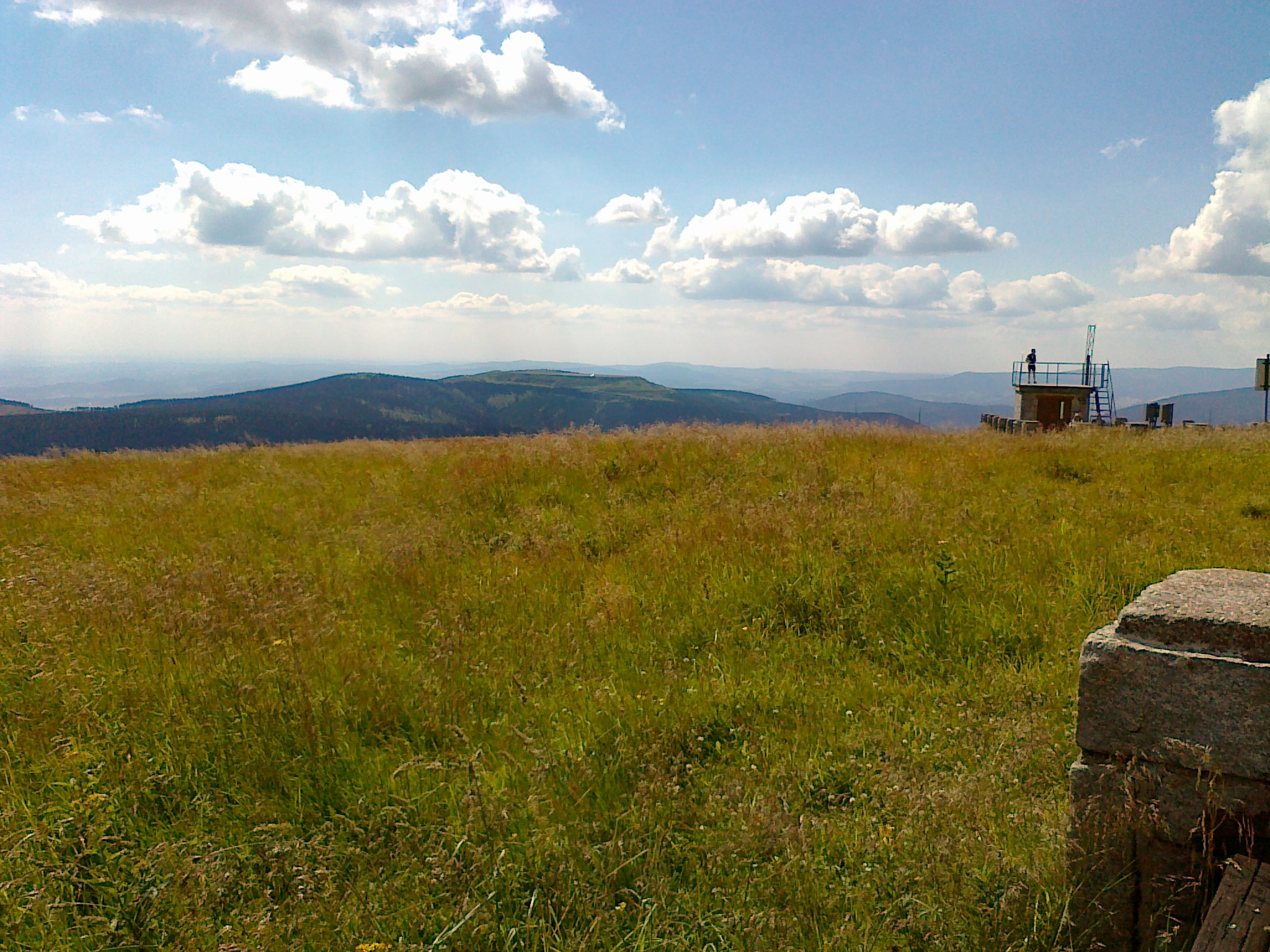
View from the summit of Praděd towards the mountains: Vřesník, Dlouhé stráně (above it the summit of Mravenečník), Kamenec, and Medvědí hora (with the summit of Ucháč barely visible)

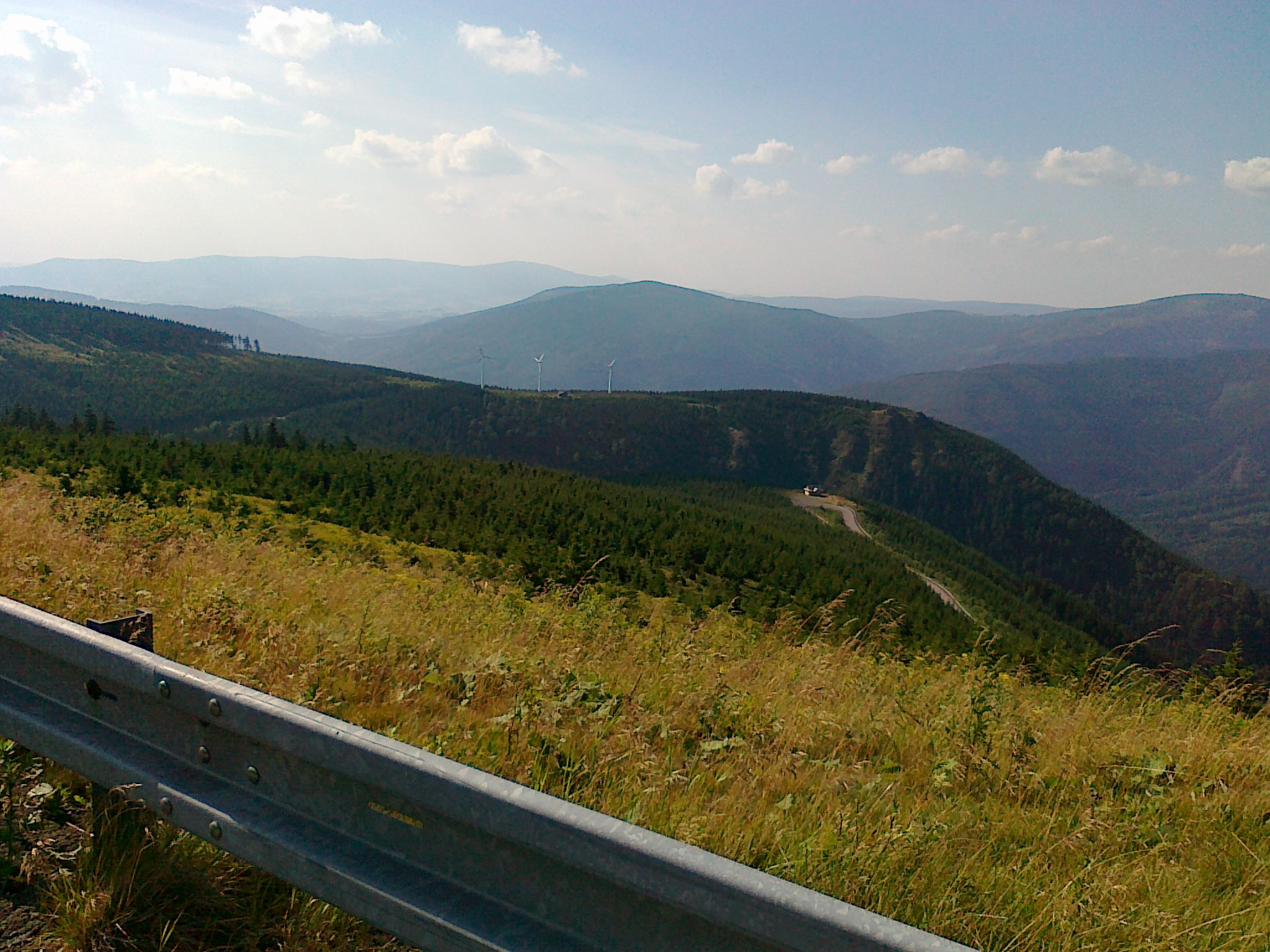
View from the lower road around the peak of Dlouhé stráně towards the summits: Kamenec and Medvědí hora, above it Černá stráň, Polom, and Vozka, below it Suchá hora and Šindelná hora–JZ (in the distance to the left, the peaks of the Králický Sněžník Mountains)

Medvědí hora is located in the central-western region of the Hrubý Jeseník range, situated in the north-western area (microregion) called the Praděd Mountains and positioned on a branch extending from the side ridge of the Praděd Mountains, stretching from Hubertka mountain to the Vlčí sedlo pass. For this reason, it is an indistinct summit, difficult to recognize against the backdrop of the entire Dlouhé stráně massif. A certain element that allows the summit to be located is the three visible towers – wind turbines located close to the summit, which are part of the Mravenečník wind farm. The summit is visible from the road surrounding the summit area of Praděd mountain, where it emerges below the line of sight towards Ucháč mountain. Moreover, it is very well visible from another characteristic viewpoint – from the road surrounding the summit of Dlouhé stráně (visible above the Salaš mountain hut) and from some other places, e.g., from road no. 44 on the slope of Velký Klínovec mountain.

The summit and its slopes are bounded by:

- to the north by the valley of the Divoká Desná river
- to the east and southeast by the valley of the Borový potok stream
- to the south by a pass at an altitude of 1160 m above sea level towards the summit of Kamenec (1) (Note: The designation is indexed to distinguish it from two other peaks in the same range with the same name: Kamenec (2), located 3.3 km southeast of the Skřítek pass, and Kamenec (3), located 1.7 km east of the village of Bělá.) and the valley of the Tříramenný potok stream
- to the west by a pass at an altitude of 913 m above sea level towards the summit of Dlouhý vrch.

In the vicinity of Medvědí hora, the following summits are located:

- to the east Tupý vrch
- to the southeast Dlouhé stráně
- to the south Mravenečník
- to the southwest Kamenec (1) and Jedlový vrch
- to the west Skály (2) (Note: The designation is indexed to distinguish it from another peak in the same range with the same name, Skály (1), located 4.5 km west of the village of Vrbno pod Pradědem.) and Dlouhý vrch
- to the northwest Suchá hora
- to the north Skalký u Červenohorského sedla–JZ and Skalký u Červenohorského sedla
- to the northeast Hřbety–JZ and Rysí skála.

=== Slopes ===
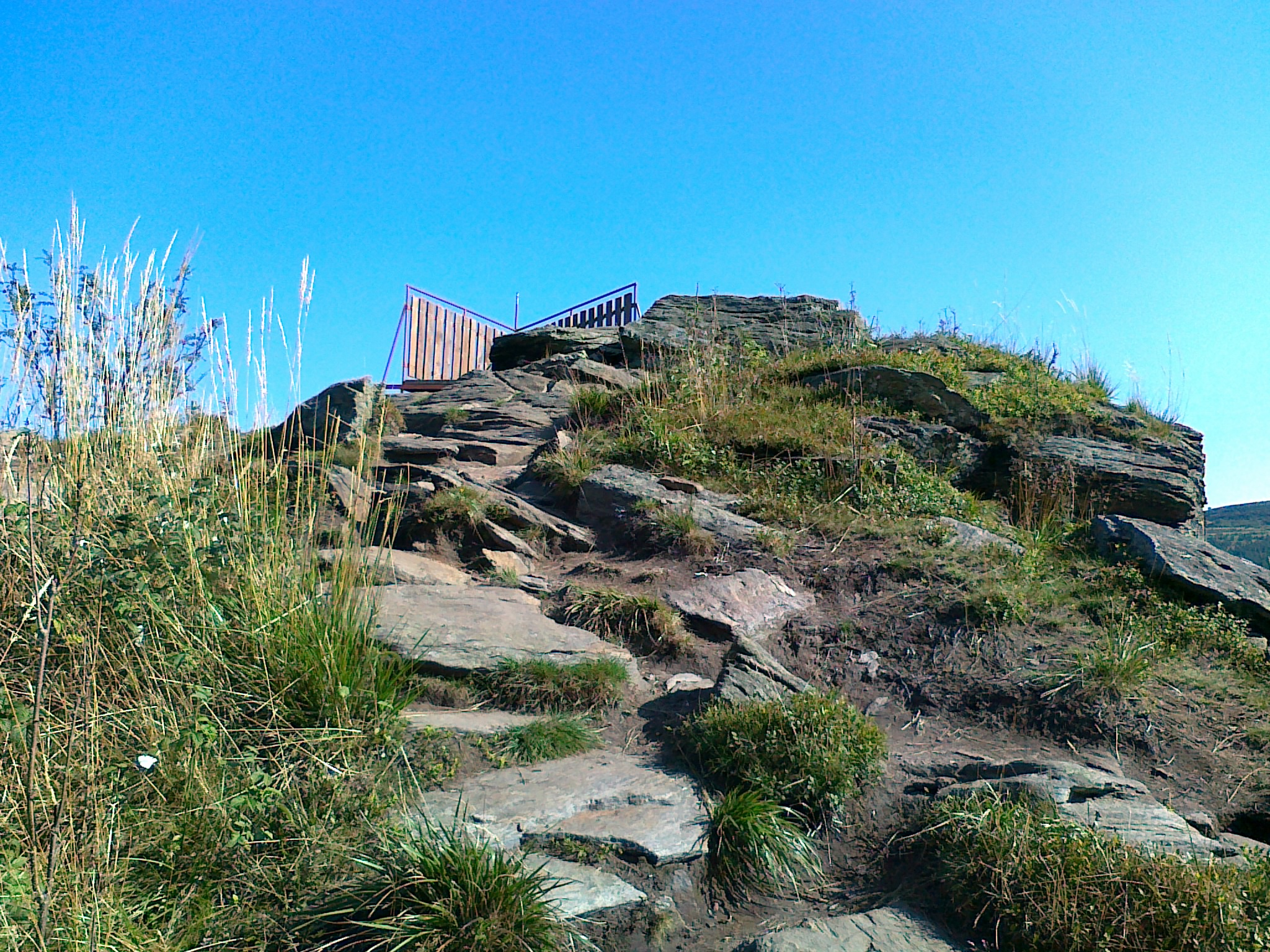
Viewpoint on the rock group Rysí skála named Vyhlídka Rysí skála

Within the peak, five main slopes can be distinguished:

- eastern
- northeastern
- northern
- northwestern
- western, named U tří potoků

All types of forestation can be found here: spruce forest, mixed forest, (Note: The forest stand of the entire Jeseníky Protected Landscape Area includes: European spruce 84%, European beech 10%, European larch 1.5%, sycamore maple 1.1%, birch 1%, common alder 0.8%, dwarf mountain pine 0.4%, grey alder 0.3%, (European silver fir, European ash, and linden) 0.2%, Scotch pine 0.1%, and others (Pinus mugo, oak, hornbeam, Norway maple, elm, rowan, green alder, aspen, poplar, and goat willow) 0.2%.) and deciduous forest. The upper parts of all slopes near the summit area are mostly covered by spruce forest, while descending in altitude, they transition into mixed forest and deciduous forest. Nearly all slopes are characterized by significant variability in forest height (from 3 to 30 metREs), with clearings, cut-throughs for pistes and associated ski lifts, and extensive glades. At the base of the northeastern and northwestern slopes, there is a significant clearing for a 400 kV overhead power line from the Dlouhé stráně Hydro Power Plant. On the steep eastern slope, there is a rock group named Skalý Medvědí hory, stretching from the summit to about 850 metres above sea level. Other rock groups, such as Rysí skála, and individual rock formations are also found on this slope, as well as on the northwestern slope. About 100 metres northeast of the summit, near the Medvědí hora (Rysí skála) tourist stop, there are two twin tourist canopies, next to which, on the Rysí skála rock group, there is a viewpoint named Vyhlídka Rysí skála with a platform surrounded by railings on two sides, offering views towards the Praděd mountain.

The slopes have relatively uneven, generally steep, and varied inclinations. The average slope inclinations range from 10° (western slopes) to 30° (eastern slope). The average inclination of all slopes (weighted arithmetic mean of slope inclinations) is about 17°. The maximum average inclination of the eastern slope, near the rock group at elevations around 950 metres above sea level over a 50-metre section, does not exceed 55°. At the base of the northwestern slope, near the Kouty nad Desnou settlement, runs the I/44 road from Šumperk to Jeseník. The slopes are covered with a network of roads with designated cycling routes (e.g., Uhlířská cesta) and generally unmarked paths and trails. Additionally, an observation tower has been built on the western slope.

==== Observation tower ====
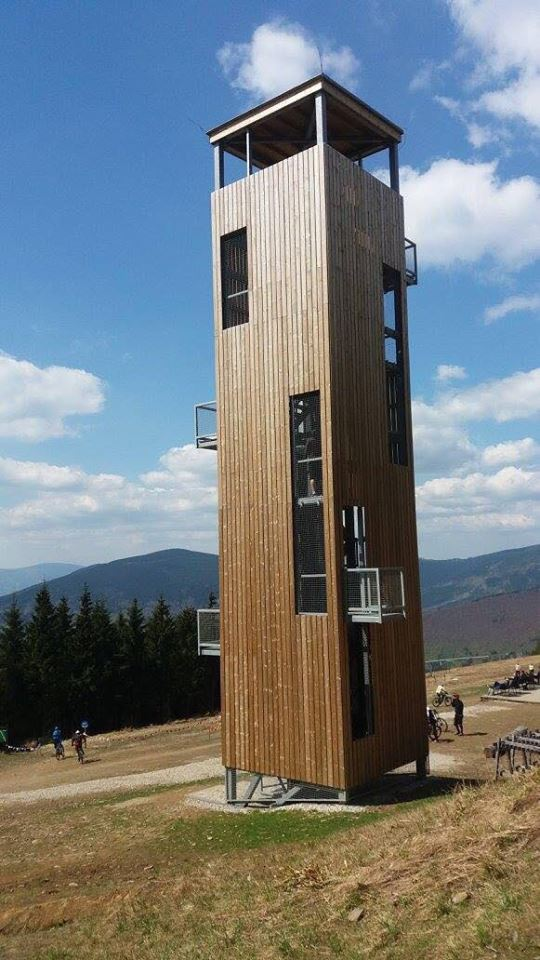
U Tetřeví chaty observation tower

To enhance the attractiveness of the mountain tourist area near the village of Loučná nad Desnou, following the earlier construction of a chairlift and the establishment of the NS Rysí skála educational trail, the state enterprise Lesy ČR decided to build an observation tower called U Tetřeví chaty near the upper terminal of the chairlift.

The tower is located about 550 metres southwest of the peak, at an altitude of 1,095 metres above sea level, and approximately 50 metres from the upper chairlift station. It was built between June and October 2014 and opened on 23 October. The tower has a cuboid shape with dimensions 4.1 × 4.1 × 18 metres and features a steel skeleton structure with internal circular stairs around the walls, mounted on a concrete foundation. It is clad in vertical wooden slats and has window openings and viewing balconies situated at different heights on some walls, along with a main platform under the roof. The tower may be closed in adverse weather conditions such as icing or storms. Access to the tower is via the chairlift from the settlement of Kouty nad Desnou. The tower offers panoramic views from the west to the north, including the area of some peaks of the Keprník Mountains. A fast food outlet Bar u Medvěda in the form of a rotunda is located on the platform near the tower. The total cost of the tower and nearby facilities and their connections was approximately 8,300,000 CZK (including about 2,800,000 CZK for the tower).

=== Summit ===
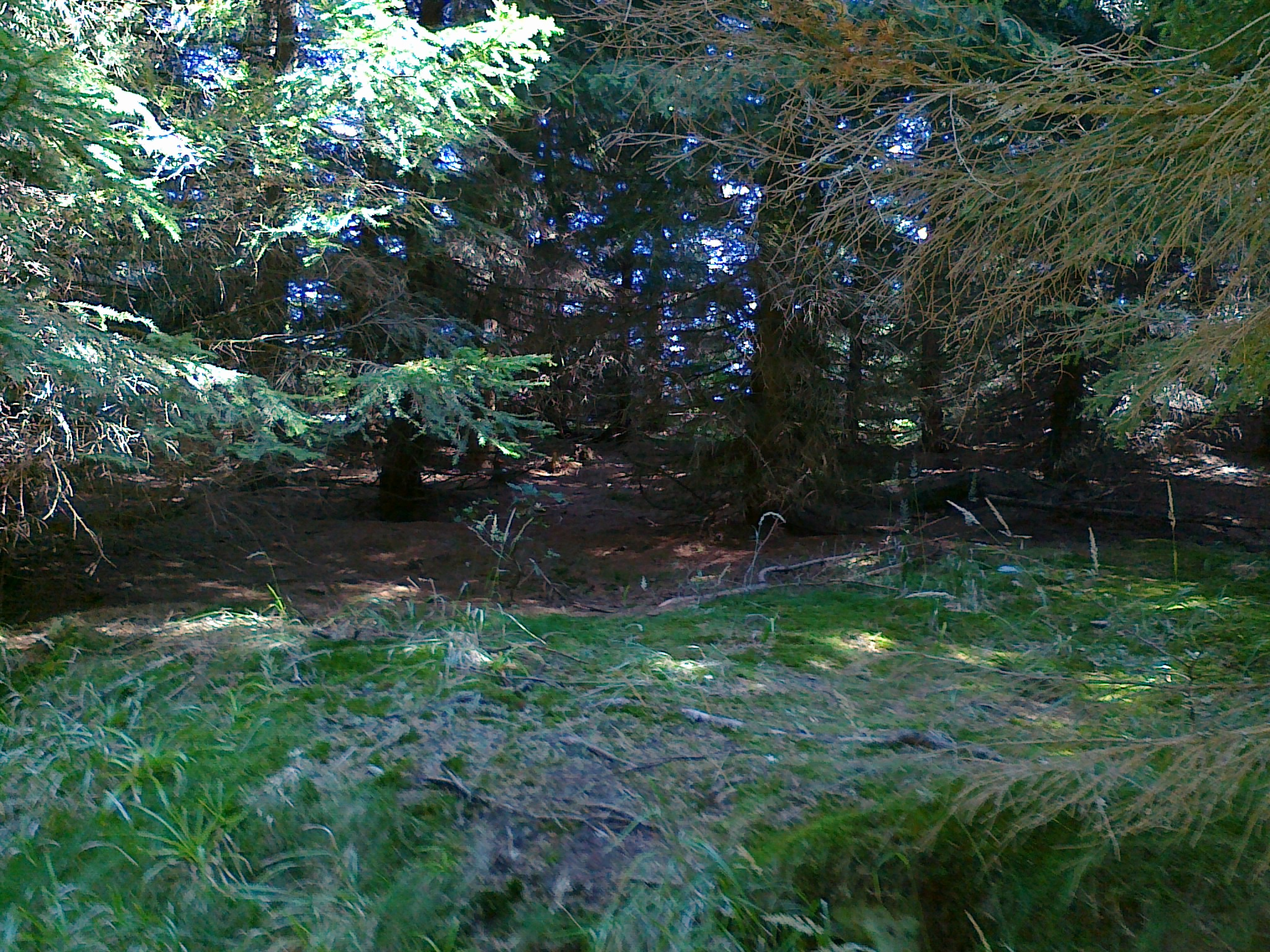
Summit plateau of Medvědí hora

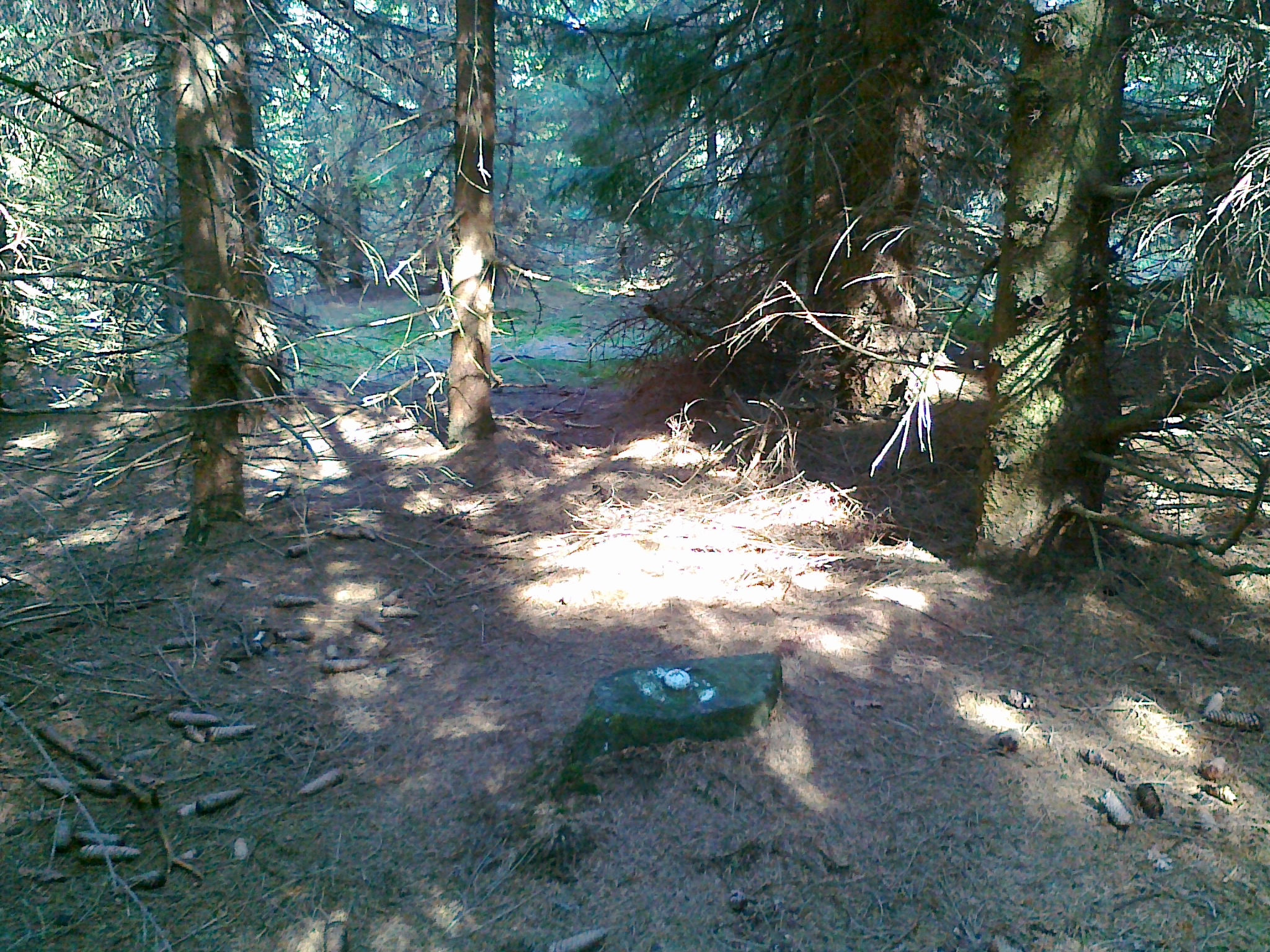
Triangulation station (benchmark) on the summit plateau of Medvědí hora

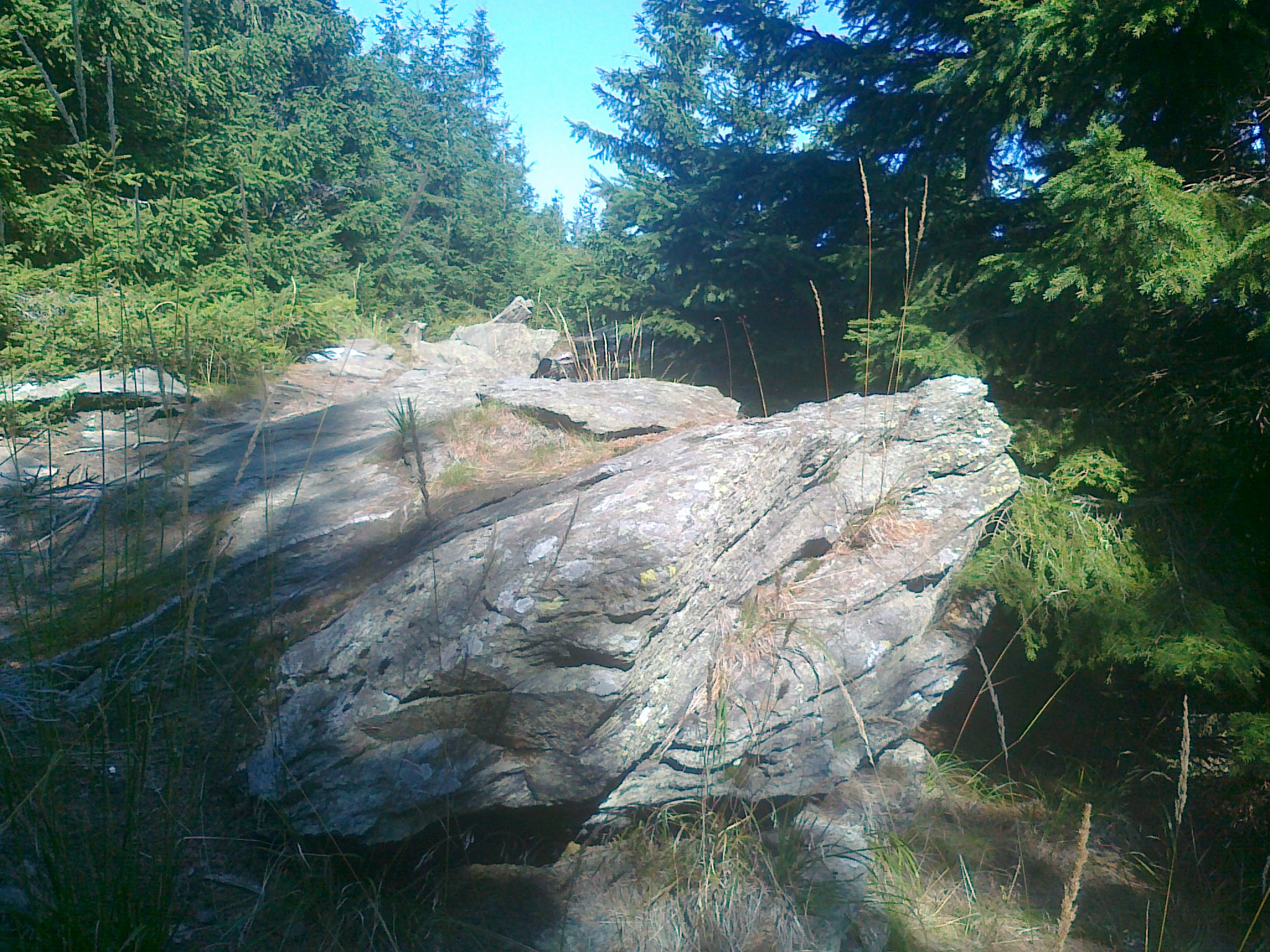
Summit rock group of Medvědí hora

The summit plateau is traversed by a main path from the Tetřeví chata tourist intersection, marked with an informational board indicating an elevation of 1,165 m, to the Medvědí hora (Rysí skála) tourist stop, marked with an informational board indicating an elevation of 1,162 m. The summit plateau is forested with spruce forest and covered with alpine grass. There is a secondary triangulation station on the summit plateau in the form of a benchmark, marked on geodetic maps with the number 22.3, at an elevation of 1,162.20 m and geographical coordinates 50°05′19.06″N 17°08′49.05″E, located about 20 m northwest of the summit. On the summit, there is a rock group that serves as a limited viewpoint, offering restricted views towards Dlouhé stráně mountain. The State Administration of Land Surveying and Cadastre lists the highest point – the summit – at an elevation of 1,163.6 m with geographical coordinates 50°05′15.9″N 17°08′49.8″E.

Access to the summit is via a marked green educational trail from the Tetřeví chata tourist intersection. Walking towards the Medvědí hora (Rysí skála) tourist stop for about 400 metres, one needs to turn right onto an unmarked path and after about 20 metres, one will reach the summit rock group.

=== Geology ===
Geologically, the summit and slopes of Medvědí hora belong to the unit known as the Vrbno layers, and partly to the unit known as the Desná Dome. They are composed of metamorphic rocks, primarily gneisses (plagioclases), phyllites, phyllonites (biotites, muscovites, chlorites), amphibolites, stromatites, and migmatites, as well as Sedimentary rocks, primarily quartzites and meta-conglomerates.

=== Waters ===
The summit and its slopes are located southwest of the European watershed boundary, thus belonging to the Black Sea basin. Waters from this part of the Hrubý Jeseník mountains flow into the Danube river basin, which is an extension of the rivers and mountain streams originating here, including the Divoká Desná river and streams such as Borový potok and Tříramenný potok. From the northwestern and northern slopes, several short, unnamed streams originate, feeding into the Divoká Desná river. Approximately 920 m west of the summit, on the Borový potok stream, at an elevation of about 810 m, there is a waterfall named Vodopád na Borovém potoce with a total height of 14 m. Access to it is from the blue tourist trail running from the Pod Medvědí horou tourist intersection. Additionally, at the foot of the northwest slope, close to the flowing Divoká Desná river, there are two oval connected water reservoirs, measuring 40 m and 95 m in length.

== Nature protection ==
The summit and its slopes are within the protected area called the Jeseníky Protected Landscape Area, established to protect rock, soil formations, plant life, and rare animal species. No small-scaled protected areas have been established on the slopes.

In 2013, a circular educational trail named Naučná stezka Rysí skála was designated on the slopes and summit plateau of Medvědí hora, at elevations ranging from 1,080 to 1,163 metres, covering a distance of about 2 km with 10 observation points along the route Medvědí hora (cable car station) – Rysí skála viewpoint – Medvědí hora summit – Tetřeví chata – Medvědí hora (cable car station).

== Tourism ==
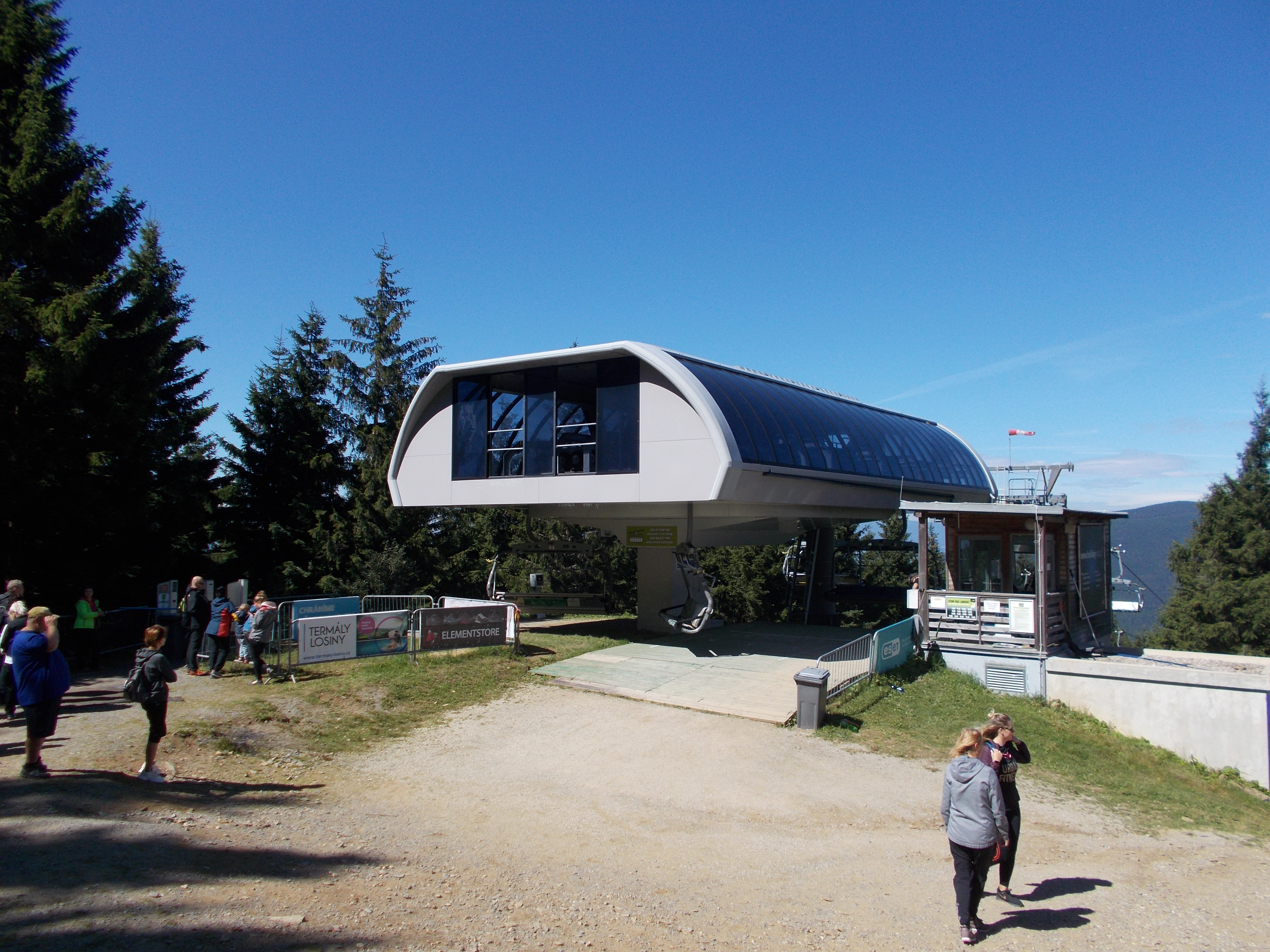
Upper station of the chairlift on the route from Kouty nad Desnou to Medvědí hora

=== Hiking trails ===
The Czech Tourist Club has marked four hiking trails on the slopes or at their bases:

Kouty nad Desnou – Skály (2) – U obrázku pass – Dlouhý vrch – Medvědí hora – Kamenec (1) – Mravenečník – Dlouhé stráně summit – upper reservoir of the Dlouhé stráně Hydro Power Plant – U Okenní štoly

Pod Medvědí horou – Borový potok river valley – Schnellerův kříž (Note: Schnellerův kříž is located on the adjacent slope of the mountain Tupý vrch.) – Vodopád Borového potoka waterfall

Kouty nad Desnou – Divoká Desná river valley – U Kamenné chaty – Praděd National Nature Reserve – Velký Děd – Praděd summit

Kouty nad Desnou – Hřbety – Nad Petrovkou – Kamzík – Velký Jezerník – Sedlo Velký Jezerník pass – Švýcárna mountain hut – Praděd – U Barborky pass – Petrovy kameny – Ovčárna – Karlova Studánka

=== Trails and cycling routes ===
Around the slopes or at the base, four cycling routes run on the following trails:

Loučná nad Desnou – Seč – Čepel – Mravenečník – Medvědí hora – Kamenec (1) – Dlouhé stráně – Velká Jezerná – Divoká Desná river valley – Kouty nad Desnou – Černá stráň – Přemyslovské sedlo pass – Tři kameny – Ucháč – Jelení skok – Loveč – Lískovec – Loučná nad Desnou

Přemyslovské sedlo – Přemyslov – Loučná nad Desnou – Seč – Kamenec (1) – Skály (2) – U obrázku pass – Medvědí hora – Kouty nad Desnou

U obrázku – Medvědí hora – Kamenec (1) – Mravenečník – Margareta

Přemyslov – Černá stráň – Hučivá Desná stream valley – Červená hora – Šindelná hora – Suchá hora – Kouty nad Desnou – Hřbety – Nad Petrovkou – Petrovka

Additionally, on the northwestern slope, mountain biking routes of the Bikepark Kouty are marked:

Koutíkův sen: Upper station of the cable car – Medvědí hora – Areál Kouty (cable car)

Stará medvědice: Upper station of the cable car – Medvědí hora – Areál Kouty (cable car)

Hřebenovka – Kouty: Upper station of the cable car – Medvědí hora – Dlouhý vrch – U obrázku pass – Skály (2) – Kouty nad Desnou

Uhlířská stopa: Upper station of the cable car – Medvědí hora – Kamenec (1) – U obrázku pass – Skály (2) – Kouty nad Desnou

==== Road climbs ====
At the foot of Medvědí hora, a road climb runs along route 44 from the town of Loučná nad Desnou to Červenohorské sedlo pass, popular with cyclists and motorcyclists:

(Length: 11.8 km, elevation gain: 506 m, average gradient: 4.3%, 9 road loops)

=== Ski trails ===
During snow periods, some hiking and cycling trails are used for cross-country skiing. Within the slopes of Medvědí hora, four main downhill ski trails with corresponding lifts are part of the ski resort named Ski Areál Kouty nad Desnou: (Note: Other downhill ski trails of the Ski Areál Kouty nad Desnou ski resort are located from the summit of Dlouhý vrch and Skály (2).)

Main downhill ski trails with lifts from Medvědí hora
Number	Trail and name	Trail length (meters)	Elevation gain (meters)	Lift type	Lift length (meters)
1	U vrtulí	650	100	T-bar	650
2	Medvědí	2,150	500	chairlift	1,933
3	Hřebenovka	2,450	500	chairlift	1,933
4	Pohodová	3,050	520	chairlift	1,933
