= Černá stráň =

Mountain in the Czech Republic

Místo narození Matyáše Bendla (Černá stráň)
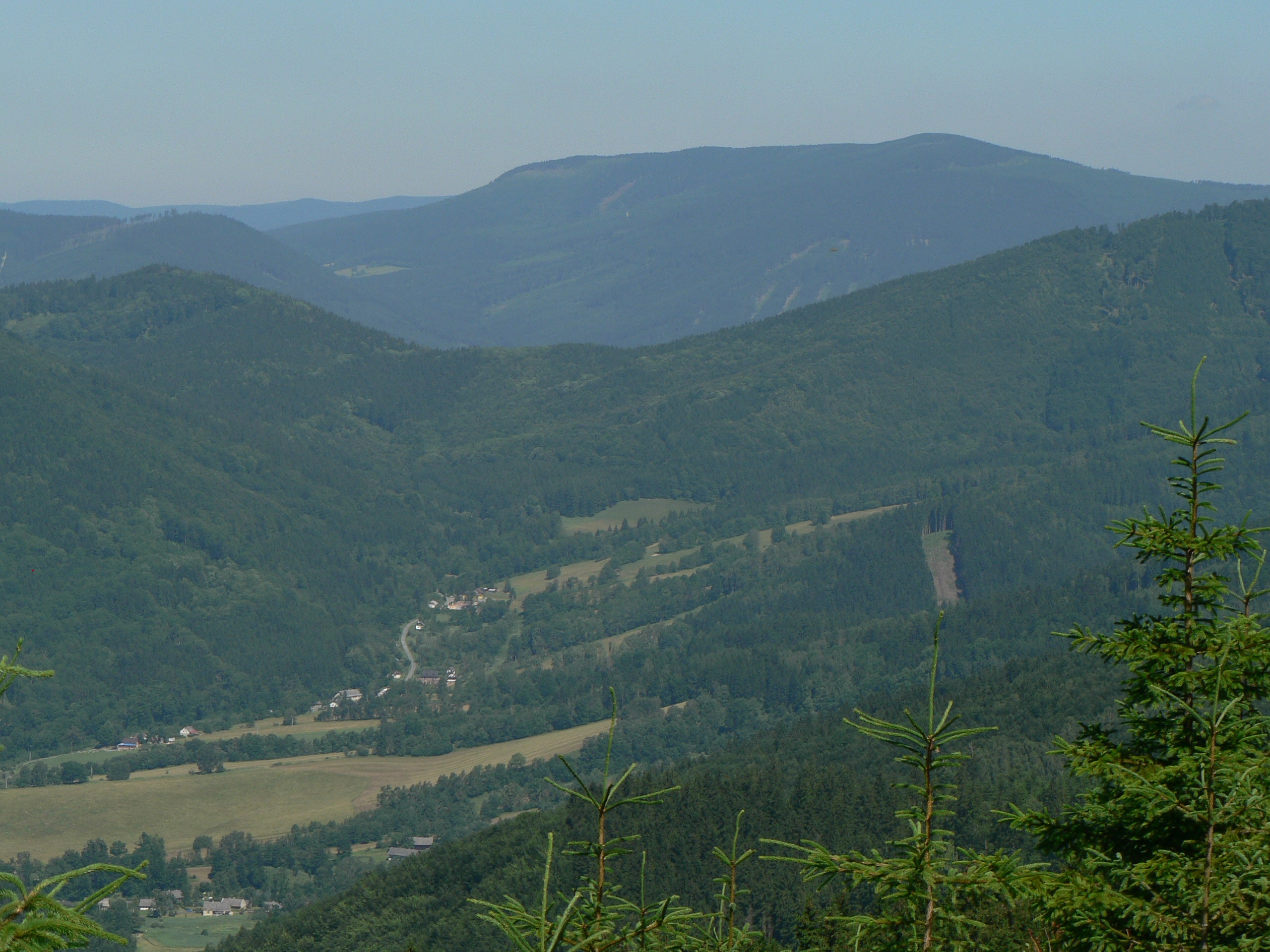
- View of Černá stráň from the south from the vicinity of Vernířovice

Highest point
- Elevation: 1,237 m (4,058 ft)
- Prominence: 212 m (696 ft)
- Isolation: 3 km (1.9 mi)
- Coordinates: 50°7′18″N 17°4′40″E

Geography
- Location within Czech Republic
- Location: Loučná nad Desnou
- Parent range: Hrubý Jeseník

Černá stráň (German: Schwarze Leiten) is a mountain in the Hrubý Jeseník mountain range in the Czech Republic. It has an elevation of 1,237 m (4,058 ft) above sea level. It is located in the municipality of Loučná nad Desnou.

== History of the mountain ==
The mountain has two notable events in its history. At the end of the 19th and the beginning of the 20th century, a forest railway operated on its slopes, and during World War II, a tragic Hungarian plane crash occurred.

=== Forest railway ===
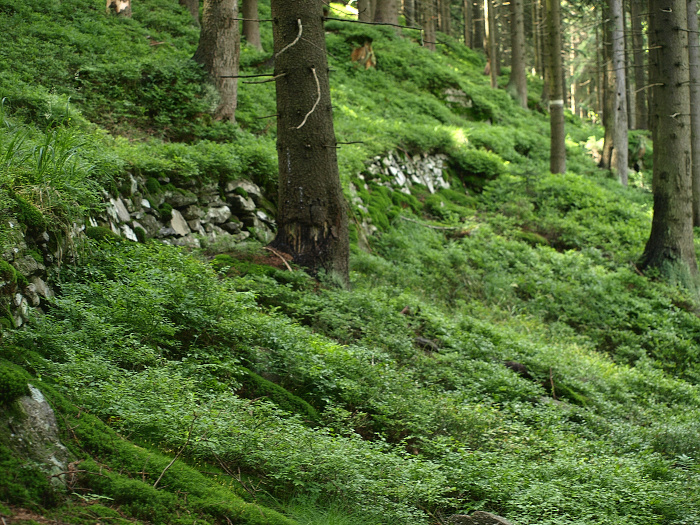
Remnants of the forest railway

On the southeastern slope of the mountain, remnants of a narrow-gauge railway network with a track gauge of 700 mm can be found. It was built on raised stone embankments used for transporting fallen and cut timber. The first line was constructed around 1895 on the southwestern slope of the mountain, running from Františkov to Josefová, with a branch leading to Černá stráň and another line running through the Hučava stream valley. This line operated until 1935. Two additional lines were built in 1898, following an October hurricane in 1897. The first line ran from Přemyslov to Černá stráň on the southern slope of the mountain, while the second ran from Kouty nad Desnou to Černá stráň on the northern and eastern slopes. These railways were dismantled and scrapped in 1945.

=== Plane crash ===
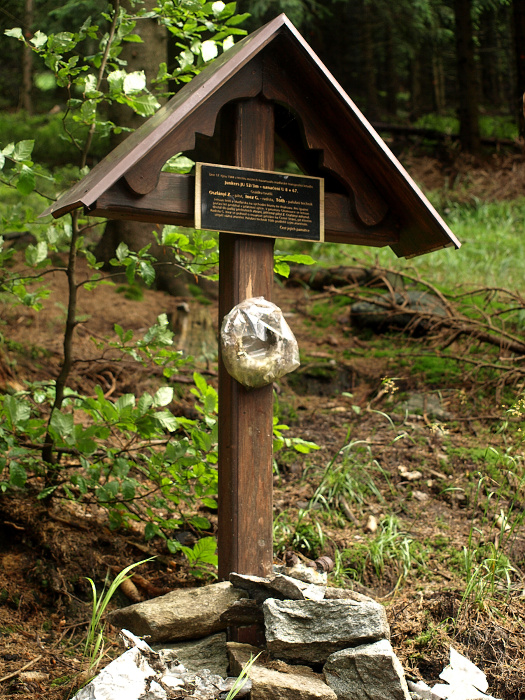
Cross at the site of the plane crash

The mountain is also associated with a tragic event. During World War II, on 17 October 1944, a Hungarian transport plane, Junkers Ju 52, crashed on the southern slope of the mountain while flying from Hungary to Kraków via a detour over Moravia to avoid Slovakia, where the Slovak National Uprising was taking place. The plane came under fire from infantry while flying over Olomouc and, continuing in difficult weather conditions, crashed into the mountain. Of the four crew members, two survived, while the pilot, Zoltán Oszlányi, died at the scene from a fire, and the severely injured radio operator, Gábor Incze, died shortly afterward. At the crash site, near a wide, unmarked forest road, approximately 600 meters northwest of the summit, at an elevation of around 1,140 meters, a wooden cross with a memorial plaque was erected. A fragment of a metal part of the plane's wreckage can be seen embedded in a tree trunk at the crash site.

== Characteristics ==
=== Location ===
Černá stráň is located in the western part of the Hrubý Jeseník mountain range, specifically in the central-southern area of the microregion known as the Keprník Mountains. It is a very expansive mountain with a domed summit area and a primary, curved ridge extending southeast to northwest for about 8 km. This ridge stretches from the settlement of Kouty nad Desnou (located near I/44 road from Šumperk to Jeseník) to the settlement of Františkov. The mountain is situated on a side ridge of the Keprník Massif, extending southwest from the Sedlo Trojmezí pass, following a sequence of peaks (Vozka → Polom → Černá stráň–S → Černá stráň). The mountain is a recognizable and visible feature from several viewpoints, including the road surrounding the summit of Praděd (visible to the right in the distance when looking toward the Velký Děd summit) or from another notable viewpoint, the road around the summit of Dlouhé stráně (visible in the distance when looking toward the wind turbine towers of the Mravenečník power plant, located near the summit of Medvědí hora).

The mountain is bordered by several features:

- to the north by the Sedlo pod Polomem pass at an elevation of 1,027 meters above sea level;
- to the northeast by the Poniklý stream valley;
- to the east by the Hučivá Desná stream valley;
- to the southeast by the Desná river valley;
- to the south by the Přemyslovský stream valley;
- to the southwest by a pass at an elevation of 661 meters above sea level leading toward Losín (a mountain in the Hanušovice Highlands range), the Novolosinský stream valley, and the Přemyslovské sedlo pass;
- to the west by a less prominent pass at 640 meters above sea level leading toward an unnamed peak at 643 meters above sea level;
- to the northwest by the Hučava stream and a pass at 1,016 meters above sea level leading toward the Kutiště peak.

Surrounding peaks include:

- Šindelná hora–JZ to the east;
- Suchá hora and Skalý to the southeast;
- Jelení skok to the south;
- Jelení skalka, Uchač–SV, Tři kameny, and Tři kameny–SZ to the southwest;
- Losín to the west;
- an unnamed peak at 731 meters above sea level and Pasák (both in the Hanušovice Highlands range), Štolný hřbet, Kutiště, Troják–JZ, and Troják to the northwest;
- Polom, Klínová hora, and Šindelná hora to the northeast.

=== Slopes ===
The mountain features 8 main slopes:

- southern slope named Černé lány
- southwestern slopes named Slunná stráň and U Staré hájenky
- western slope named Černá stráň
- northwestern slopes named Paseky and Petrův mostek
- northern slope
- northeastern slope
- eastern slope
- southeastern slope named Kazatelna

All types of forestation can be found here: spruce forest, mixed forest, (Note: The forest stand of the entire Jeseníky Protected Landscape Area includes: European spruce 84%, European beech 10%, European larch 1.5%, sycamore maple 1.1%, birch 1%, common alder 0.8%, dwarf mountain pine 0.4%, grey alder 0.3%, (European silver fir, European ash, and linden) 0.2%, Scotch pine 0.1%, and others (Pinus mugo, oak, hornbeam, Norway maple, elm, rowan, green alder, aspen, poplar, and goat willow) 0.2%.) and deciduous forest, with spruce forest dominating. Meadows are found at the base of the southern, southwestern, and western slopes. The upper parts of all slopes are mostly covered by spruce forest, while mixed and deciduous forests appear at lower elevations. Due to the mountain's large expanse, almost all slopes feature clearings, cuttings, and glades. The northwestern, northern, and especially eastern slopes contain rocky outcrops, with groups of rock formations (e.g., Kazatelna) on the southeastern and eastern slopes, and areas covered with rock debris on the western, southwestern, and northeastern slopes. At the base of the southern slope, on the southwestern slope at U Staré hájenky, and at the base of the western slope near the settlement of Františkov, a 22 kV power transmission line runs. Additionally, the southern slope base is crossed by railway line No. 293 from Šumperk to Kouty nad Desnou, with Kouty nad Desnou station and Loučná nad Desnou-Rejhotice stop located there.

The slopes have relatively varied and uneven inclinations. The maximum average slope of the northeastern slope below the Černá stráň–SV peak does not exceed 35° over a 50-meter section. The entire mountain is crisscrossed with roads (including the Knížecí cesta) and mostly unmarked trails and paths.

==== Kazatelna ====
Kazatelna is a group of rock formations that stretches in an arc across the southeastern slope of the mountain at elevations between 750 and 1,050 meters above sea level. This group includes many interesting rock formations, including rock pulpits. Additionally, at an elevation of around 865 meters above sea level, near the red cycling trail, there is a unique formation: a rock tunnel in a rocky outcrop that is 9 meters tall from the northern side, with approximate dimensions of 0.8 × 4 × 4.5 meters (height × width × depth).

=== Main summit ===
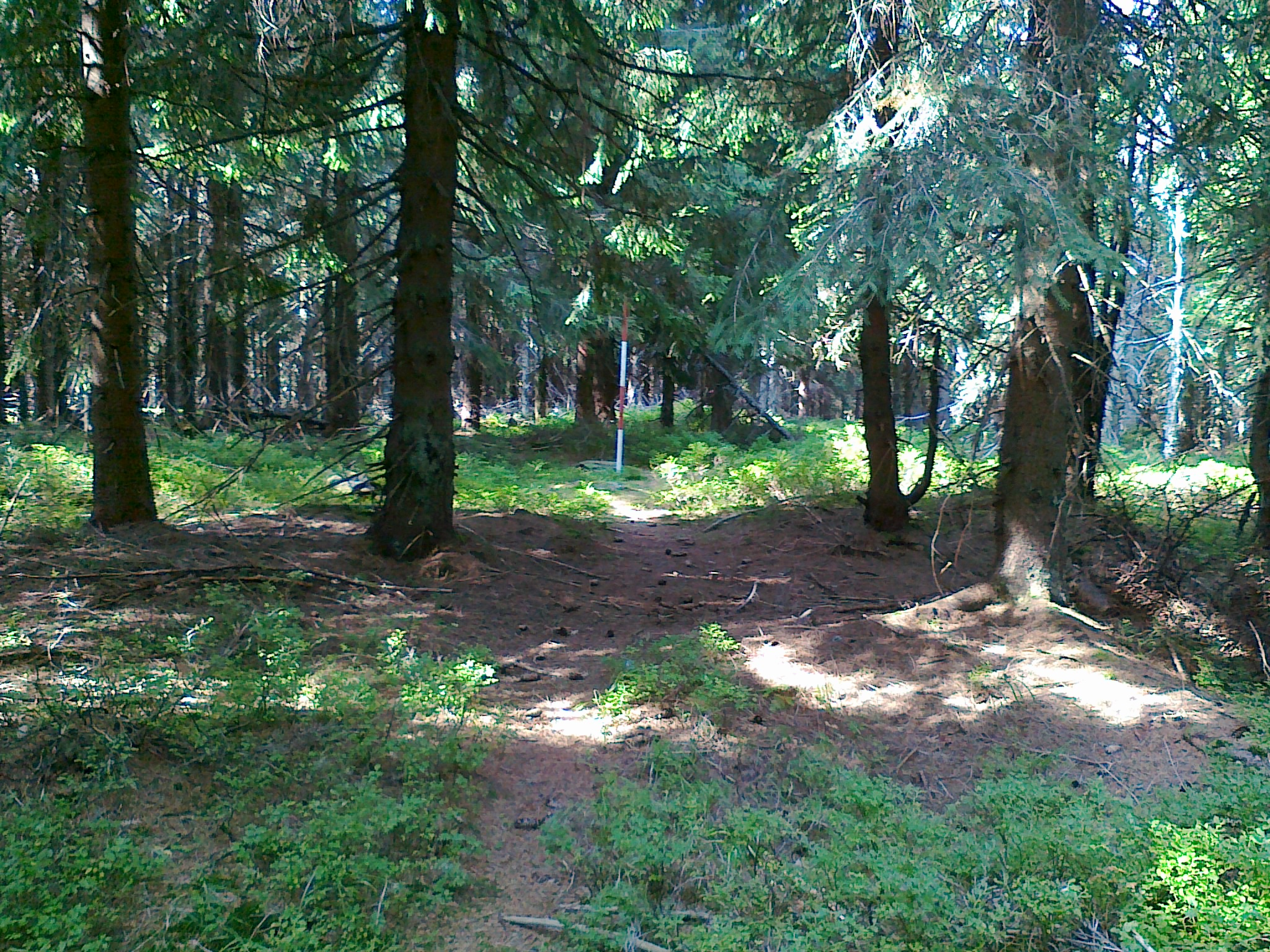
Summit area of Černá stráň

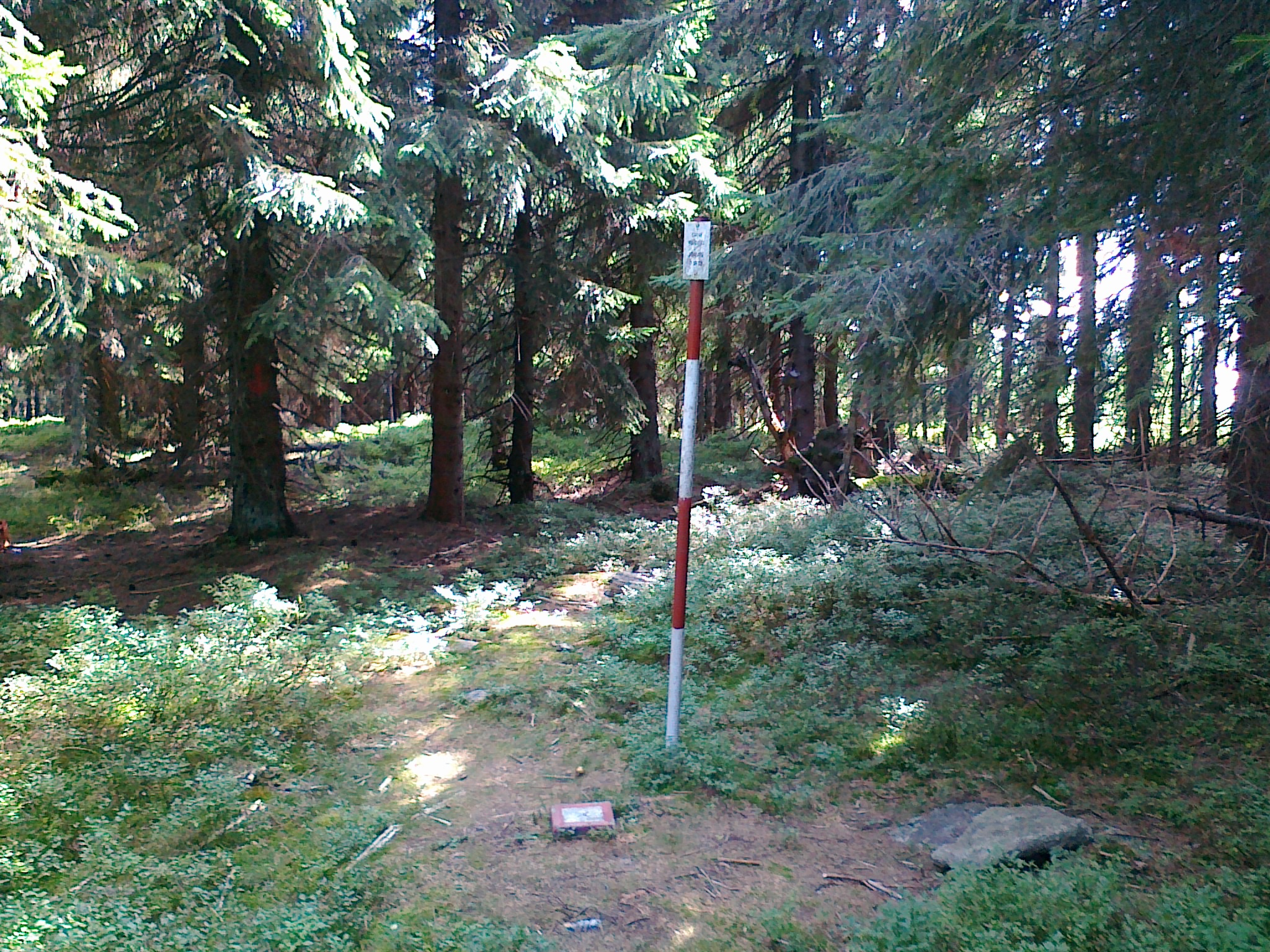
Triangulation station at the summit of Černá stráň

The summit area of Černá stráň is densely forested with spruce, and it is also covered with common vegetation of the Hrubý Jeseník region, particularly European blueberry. Due to the dense forest cover, the summit area does not offer any scenic viewpoints. There is a triangulation station on the summit, marked on geodetic maps with the number 7, at an elevation of 1,236.83 meters above sea level, with geographic coordinates 50°07′17.99″N 17°04′39.71″E. Near this triangulation station, there is a metal post painted in alternating horizontal white and red stripes, warning against damage, with a sign that reads Státní triangulace Poškození se trestá (English: State Triangulation, Damage is Punishable). According to the State Administration of Land Surveying and Cadastre, the highest point of the mountain is the summit, which has an elevation of 1,236.9 meters above sea level and coordinates 50°07′17.6″N 17°04′39.6″E, located about 10 meters southwest of the triangulation station.

To reach the summit, the route begins at a road junction located approximately 930 meters southeast of the peak. From this junction, a road (marked with two horizontal white stripes) initially leads towards the summit area, followed by a path that must be followed for about 960 meters.

=== Secondary summits ===
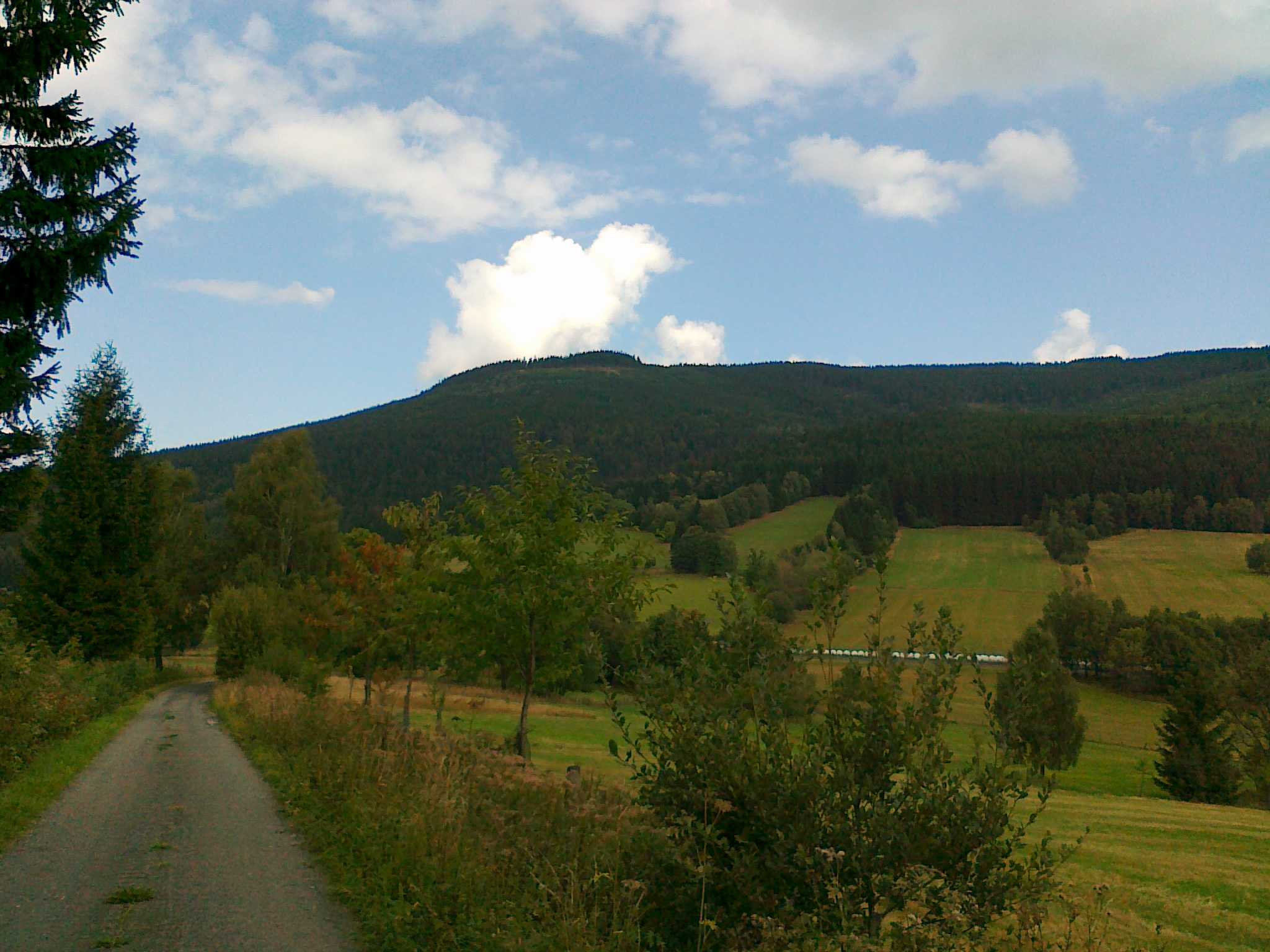
View at the secondary summit Černá stráň–ZSZ

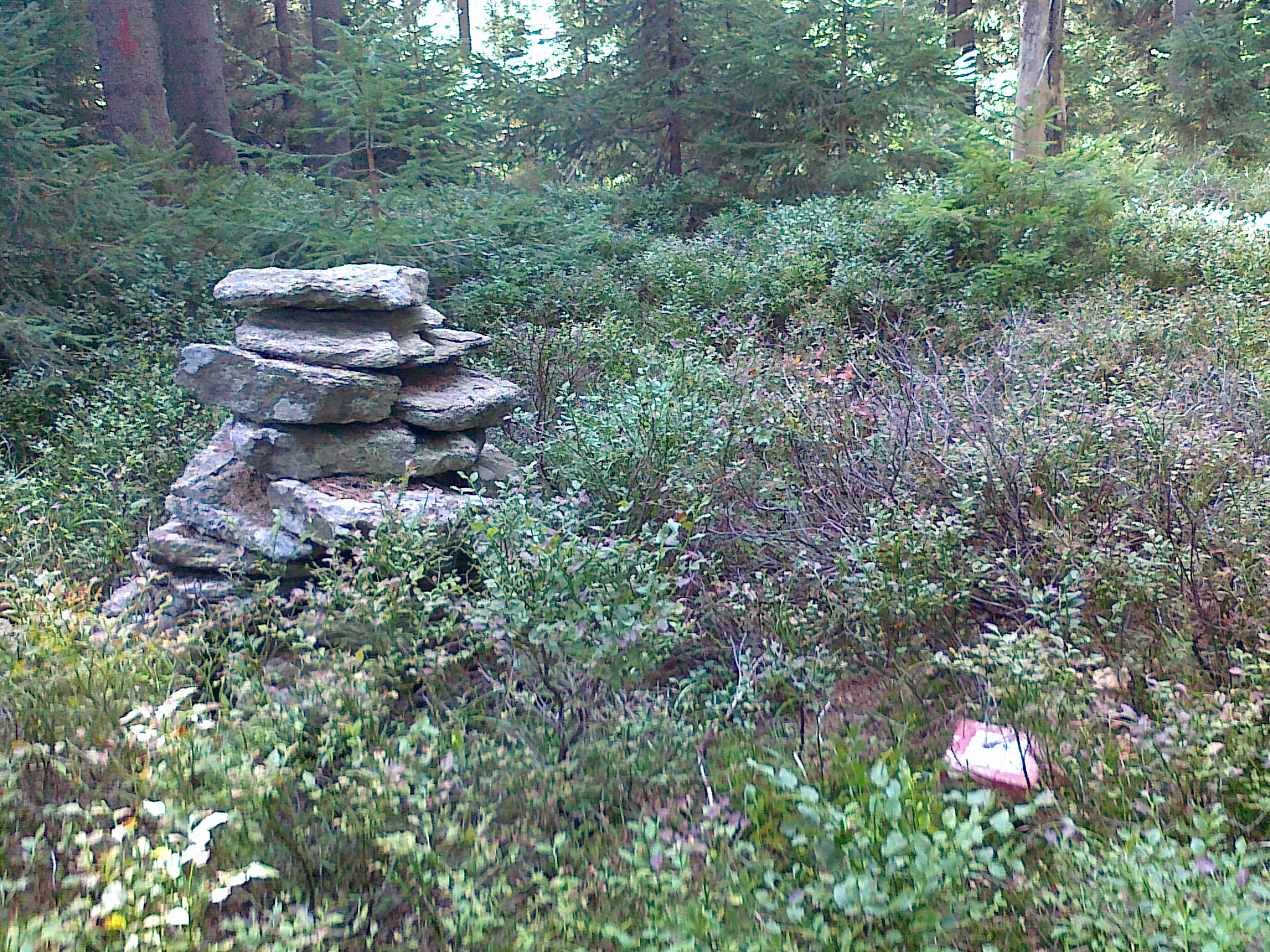
Triangulation station at the secondary summit Černá stráň–SV

In addition to the main summit, the Černá stráň massif includes four lower secondary summits:

Secondary summits of Černá stráň
Number	Summit	Elevation (meters above sea level)	Distance from main summit (kilometres)	Coordinates
1	Černá stráň–ZSZ	1,195	1.2 km to the northwest	50°07′35.3″N 17°03′46.5″E
2	Černá stráň–SZ	1,167	1.6 km to the northwest	50°07′52.5″N 17°03′40.8″E
3	Černá stráň–SV	1,111	1.0 km to the northeast	50°07′37.8″N 17°05′22.1″E
4	Černá stráň–S	1,047	1.6 km to the north	50°08′11.2″N 17°04′26.6″E

=== Geology ===
Geologically, Černá stráň belongs to the unit known as the Keprník Dome and is composed of metamorphic rocks, primarily gneiss, orthogneiss, phyllites, and phyllonites (biotite, chlorite, muscovite), mica schists (staurolite, andalusite, garnet, sillimanite), and sedimentary rocks, mainly limestone.

=== Waters ===
Černá stráň summit

Climate chart (precipitation, max. and min. temperature)
J	F	M	A	M	J	J	A	S	O	N	D
58 −4 −9	50 −3 −8	61 1 −5	61 7 −1	103 12 3	103 15 6	109 17 8	90 18 9	66 13 5	43 8 1	56 1 −4	60 −3 −7
- █ Average max. and min. temperatures in °C
- █ Precipitation totals in mm
- Source: Climate of Černá stráň. meteoblue.com
Imperial conversion
J	F	M	A	M	J	J	A	S	O	N	D
2.3 25 16	2 27 18	2.4 34 23	2.4 45 30	4.1 54 37	4.1 59 43	4.3 63 46	3.5 64 48	2.6 55 41	1.7 46 34	2.2 34 25	2.4 27 19
- █ Average max. and min. temperatures in °F
- █ Precipitation totals in inches

Černá stráň is located southwest of the European watershed and thus belongs to the Black Sea basin. The waters in this region flow into the Danube river basin, which ultimately drains into the Black Sea. This includes rivers and mountain streams originating in this part of the Hrubý Jeseník range, such as the Branná and Desná rivers, as well as streams flowing near the mountain, including Poniklý potok, Přemyslovský potok, Hučivá Desná, and Hučava. The Novolosinský potok stream also originates from the southwestern slope of the mountain. Several unnamed short streams flow from the slopes into the Desná river and its tributaries, such as Poniklý potok, Přemyslovský potok, Hučivá Desná, and Hučava.

Additionally, there is a small waterfall on Poniklý potok, located between the slopes of Černá stráň and Klínová hora, approximately 1,700 meters northeast of the summit at an elevation of 810 meters above sea level. The waterfall, known as Vodopád na Poniklém potoce, is about 3 meters high. It can be reached via an unmarked asphalt road from the Poniklý potok tourist intersection, marked at an elevation of 656 meters.

At the base of the slopes, there are several ponds of various sizes: a triangular pond with sides approximately 50 meters long and an oval pond about 35 meters long (located on the southern slope near the Rejhotice settlement), an oval pond about 32 meters long (on the western slope near the Bělidlo settlement), and another oval pond about 60 metres long (on the western slope near the Františkov settlement). Additionally, there are several marshy areas on the southern and eastern slopes.

==== Springs ====
Numerous springs can be found on the slopes of Černá stráň:

Springs at the slopes of Černá stráň
Number	Spring name	Distance from summit (meters)	Elevation (meters above sea level)	Geographic coordinates
1	Novolosinská studánka (9996)	1,160 m to the southwest	903	50°07′06″N 17°03′44″E
2	Pramen na Selské cestě (14323)	2,700 m to the southeast	595	50°05′55″N 17°05′24″E
3	Studánka Pod Horní Bremsberskou boudou (13436)	1,410 m to the southeast	980	50°06′35″N 17°05′04″E
4	Studánka U Horní Bremsberské boudy (13435)	1,260 m to the southeast	1,010	50°06′39″N 17°04′59″E
5	Studánka U Rudolfky (13434)	370 m to the northeast	1,160	50°07′24″N 17°04′56″E

== Nature preservation ==
Almost the entire mountain, except for a small area near the Přemyslovské sedlo pass, is located within the protected area known as the Jeseníky Protected Landscape Area. This area was established to protect rock formations, geological features, plants, and rare animal species. The southern-western slope of the mountain includes the nature monument Slunná stráň. Additionally, at the foot of this slope, there are small fragments of the Přemyslovské sedlo Nature Reserve and the Letní stráň Nature Monument, which primarily cover the slope of the neighboring mountain Tři kameny. On the northwestern slope, Paseky, there is also a small fragment of the Pod Slunečnou strání Nature Reserve, which mostly covers the slope of the Štolný hřbet mountain. No educational trails have been marked on the slopes of Černá stráň.

=== Slunná stráň Nature Monument ===
The Slunná stráň Nature Monument is located at the foot of the slope, near the flowing Novolosinský potok and the Přemyslovské sedlo pass, at elevations ranging from 715 to 846 metres above sea level, and covers an area of 38.5 ha (95 acres). It is located approximately 1.5 km southwest of the summit of Černá stráň. The nature monument was established on 12 December 2018 by the Czech Agency for Nature Conservation and Landscape Protection (Czech: Agentura ochrany přírody a krajiny České republiky), aiming to protect the landscape of a complex of meadows, interspersed with stone blocks and pastures, home to special species of oat-grass and animals, along with their habitats.

== Tourism ==
=== Tourist trails ===
The Czech Tourist Club has marked two hiking trails in the area of Černá stráň:

Kouty nad Desnou – Černá stráň – Přemyslov – Jelení skok – Jelení skalka – Ucháč – Tři kameny summit – Nové Losiny – Černá stráň – Branná

Filipovice – Jeřáb – Mariin pramen spring – Velký Klín – Červenohorské sedlo pass – Kouty nad Desnou – Hučivá Desná valley – Sedlo pod Vřesovkou pass – Kamenné okno – Červená hora – Bílý sloup

=== Cycling routes and ski trails ===
Three cycling routes have been established around the mountain:

Loučná nad Desnou – Seč – Čepel – Mravenečník – Medvědí hora – Kamenec – Dlouhé stráně – Velká Jezerná – Divoká Desná valley – Kouty nad Desnou – Černá stráň – Přemyslovské sedlo pass – Tři kameny – Ucháč – Jelení skok – Loveč – Lískovec – Loučná nad Desnou

Přemyslovské sedlo pass – Přemyslov – Loučná nad Desnou – Seč – Kamenec – Skály – U obrázku pass – Medvědí hora – Kouty nad Desnou

Přemyslov – Černá stráň – Hučivá Desná valley – Červená hora – Šindelná hora – Suchá hora – Kouty nad Desnou – Hřbety – Nad Petrovkou – Petrovka

During the snow season, a cross-country skiing trail runs along the red cycling route. However, no downhill skiing trails have been established on the mountain.
