= Branná =

- Municipality
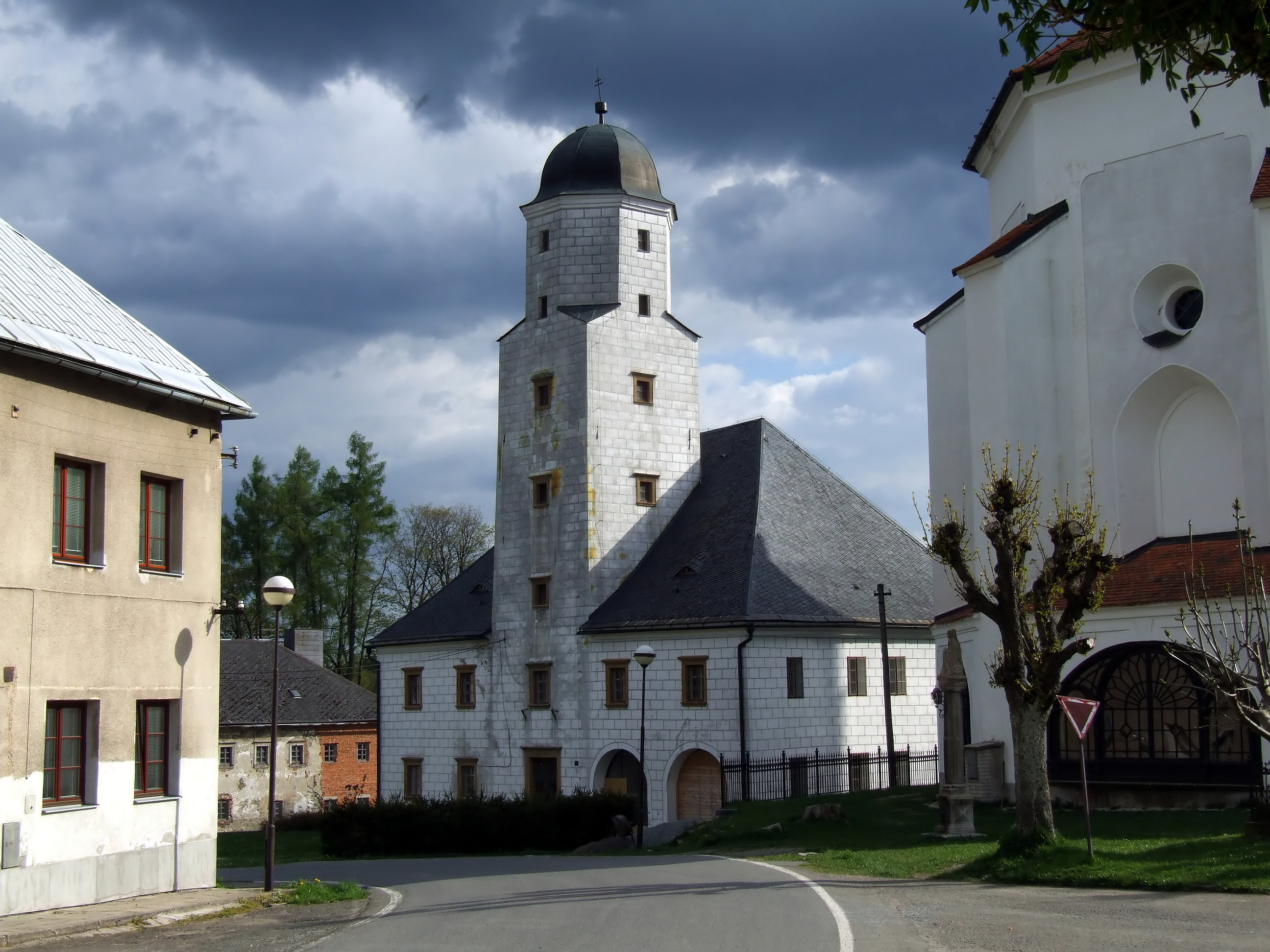
- Vogt's seat

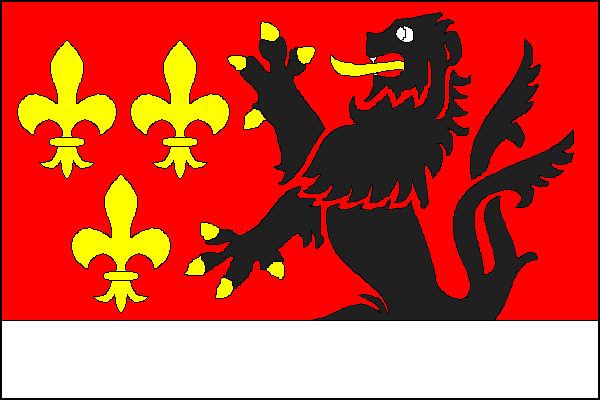
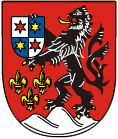
- Flag Coat of arms

- Location in the Czech Republic
- Coordinates: 50°9′12″N 17°0′42″E
- Country: Czech Republic
- Region: Olomouc
- District: Šumperk
- First mentioned: 1325

Area
  - Total: 14.56 km^{2} (5.62 sq mi)
- Elevation: 633 m (2,077 ft)

Population (2026-01-01)
  - Total: 272
  - Density: 18.7/km^{2} (48.4/sq mi)
- Time zone: UTC+1 (CET)
  - Summer (DST): UTC+2 (CEST)
- Postal codes: 788 25
- Website: www.branna.eu

Branná (until 1949 Kolštejn; German: Goldenstein) is a municipality and village in Šumperk District in the Olomouc Region of the Czech Republic. It has about 300 inhabitants. The historic town centre is well preserved and is protected as an urban monument zone.

== Geography ==
Branná is located about 21 kilometres (13 mi) north of Šumperk and 64 km (40 mi) north of Olomouc. It lies in the northern part of the Hanušovice Highlands. The highest point is a hill at 842 m (2,762 ft) above sea level. The village of Branná is situated on a rocky cliff above the Branná River.

== History ==
Branná (that time known under the name Goldenstein/Kolštejn) was founded around 1282 as a settlement on an old trade route to Silesia. The first written mention of the Kolštejn Castle is from 1325. The castle was probably built in 1308–1310.

After the Battle of White Mountain in 1620, Kolštejn was confiscated from its owners and acquired by the Liechtenstein family. During their rule, the town and the castle lost their importance. In 1918, the municipality acquired the castle.

From 1938 to 1945, Kolštejn was annexed by Nazi Germany and administered as part of the Reichsgau Sudetenland. In 1949, the name of the municipality was changed to Branná.

== Demographics ==
Historical population

Year	Pop.	±%
1869	1,274	—
1880	1,460	+14.6%
1890	1,428	−2.2%
1900	1,375	−3.7%
1910	1,432	+4.1%

Year	Pop.	±%
1921	1,246	−13.0%
1930	1,331	+6.8%
1950	521	−60.9%
1961	525	+0.8%
1970	454	−13.5%

Year	Pop.	±%
1980	430	−5.3%
1991	399	−7.2%
2001	375	−6.0%
2011	285	−24.0%
2021	272	−4.6%

Source: Censuses

== Transport ==
Branná is located on the railway line Zábřeh–Jeseník.

== Sights ==
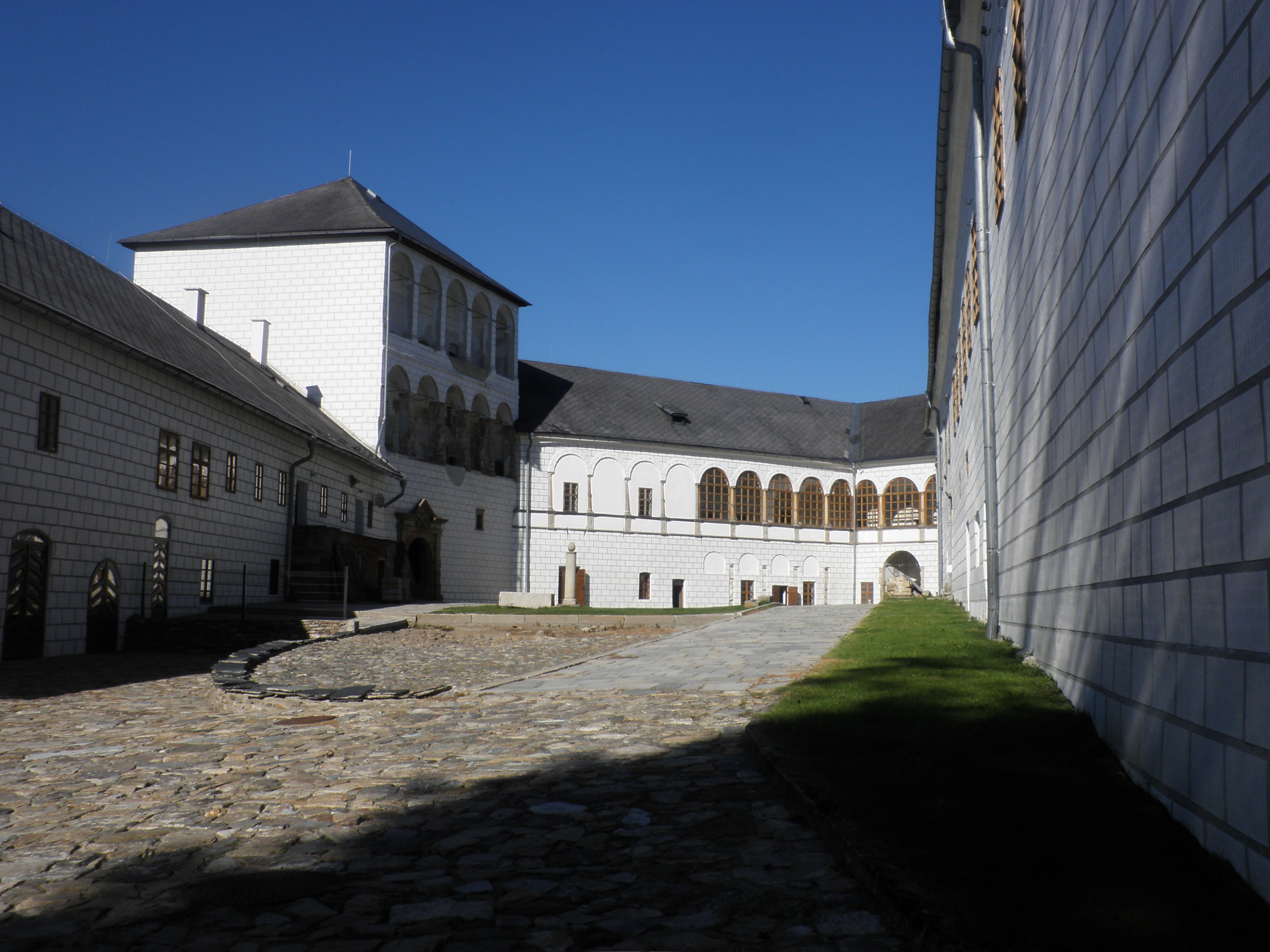
Kolštejn castle complex

The complex of the Kolštejn Castle and Kolštejn Manor House is the main landmark. The castle complex gained its today's appearance in the 15th century, when extensive fortifications were built, and in the early 17th century, when Renaissance manor house buildings and the entrance tower were built. Today the castle complex is in private ownership. The Gothic castle is a ruin open to the public, and the manor house serves as a hotel with restaurant.

A valuable monument is the Vogt's seat. It is a Renaissance building, dating from the turn of the 16th and 17th centuries. Today it is unused.

The Church of Saint Michael the Archangel was built in the late Renaissance style in 1612–1614. Next to the church are a Neoclassical rectory from 1784 and Baroque statues.
