= Kocourov =

- Village
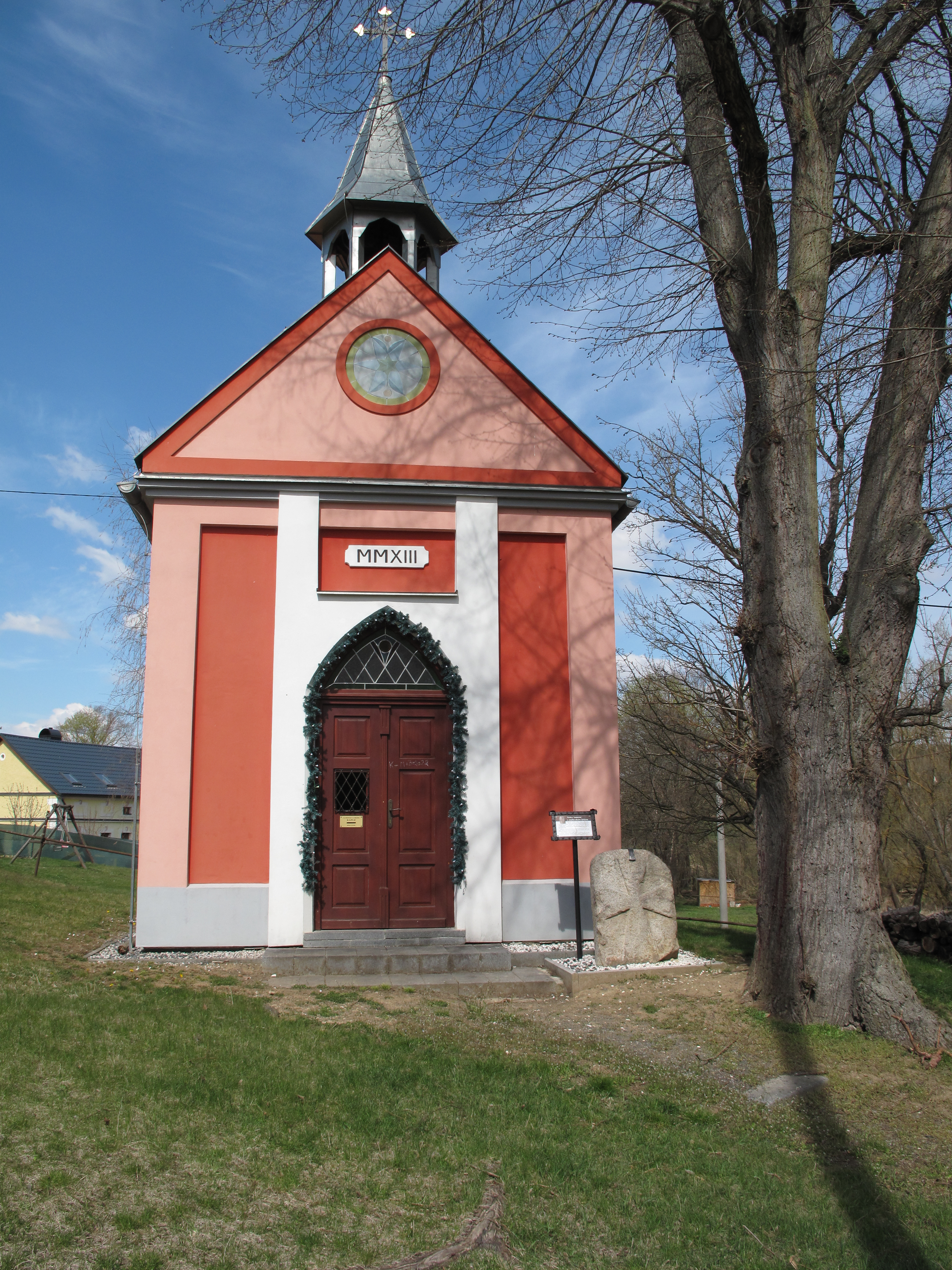
- Village chapel of the Sacred Heart
- Interactive map of Kocourov
- Coordinates: 49°33′13.248″N 12°55′13.512″E
- Country: Czech Republic
- Region: Plzeň
- District: Domažlice
- Municipality: Horšovský Týn

Area
  - Total: 4.37 km^{2} (1.69 sq mi)

Population
  - Total: 31
- Postal code: 346 01

Kocourov is a small village and a part of the town Horšovský Týn in the Domažlice District, the Czech Republic. It is located about 2 km north of Horšovský Týn on Křakovský Creek, and has 11 registered addresses. As of 2011, the village had a population of 29 residents. According to Antonín Profous, the name, which is reminiscent of the Czech word for cat (in Czech kocour), comes from the designation of the Kocour's manor, that is, a manor that belonged to a person named Kocour or Koczur.

== Description ==
Kocourov is located north of the town of Horšovský Týn, on the road from Horšov to Dolní Metelsko. The built-up part of the village is located to the east of this road between the road itself and the forest. Kocourov cadastre also includes solitude, which is accessible from road number II/193 in the east of the cadastre, west of Podražnice.

Kocourov consists of several buildings, through the center of which an asphalt road runs from east to west, and the Křakovský Stream flows from north to south. From the main road, the asphalt road slopes down into the valley to that stream. There is a pond and the chapel of the Sacred Heart. Near the turn to the village, there is a bus stop Horšovský Týn, Kocourov on the main road. A yellow tourist route passes through Kocourov, going from Dolní Metelsko along an asphalt road, and beyond Kocourov, continuing through the Kocourovský Forest along the Křakovský Stream to Horšovský Týn.

== History ==
The first written mention of the village dates back to 1542. At that time it belongs to Horšovský Týn. During the 19th and 20th centuries, the village was alternately part of other municipalities and was itself a municipality under which other settlement units fell (1921–1950). Around 1870, there was a brick factory in the village. It has been part of the city of Horšovský Týn since 1969.

== Gallery ==
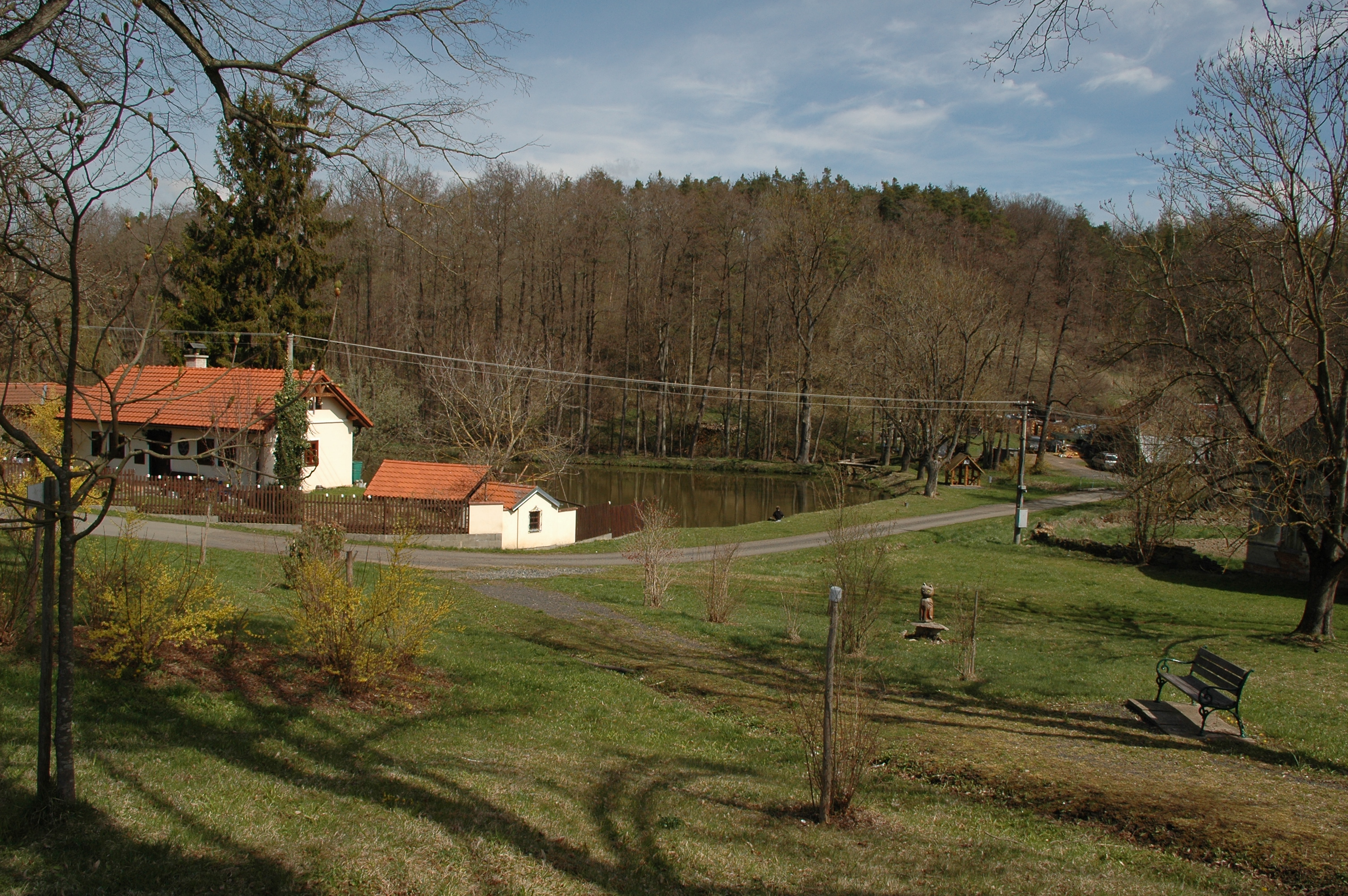
Village square with a pond

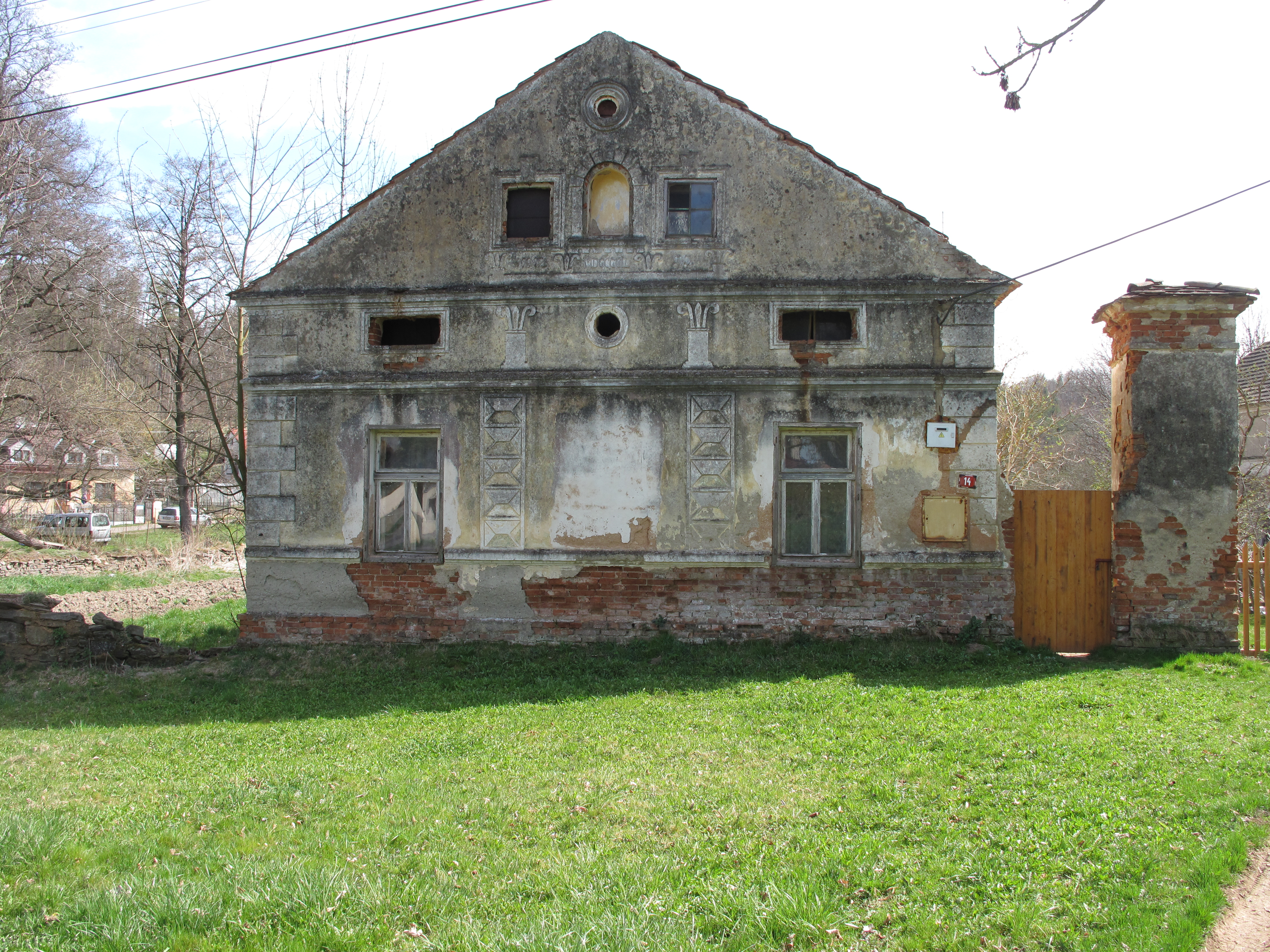
One of the houses

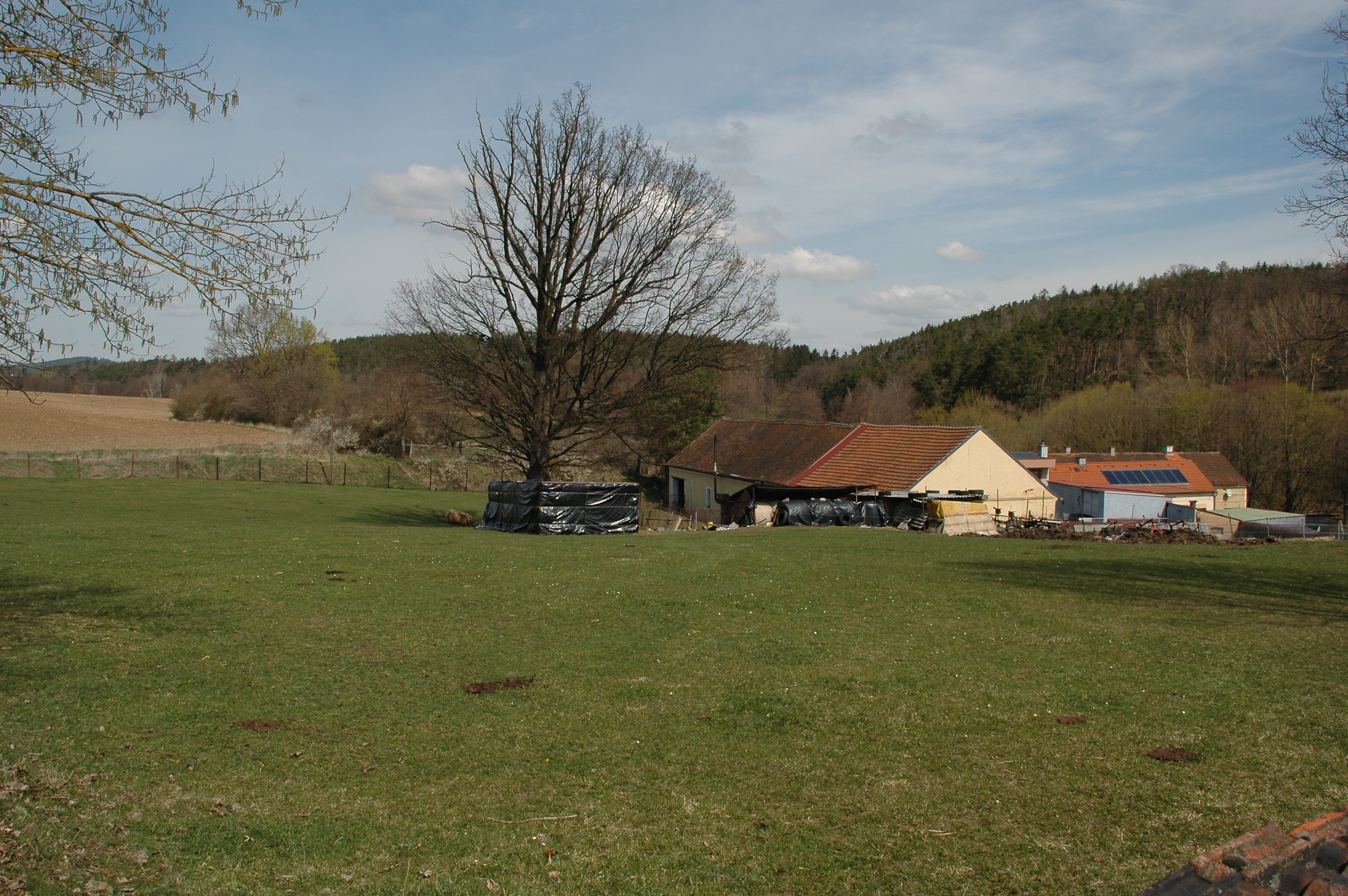
Garden of the farm

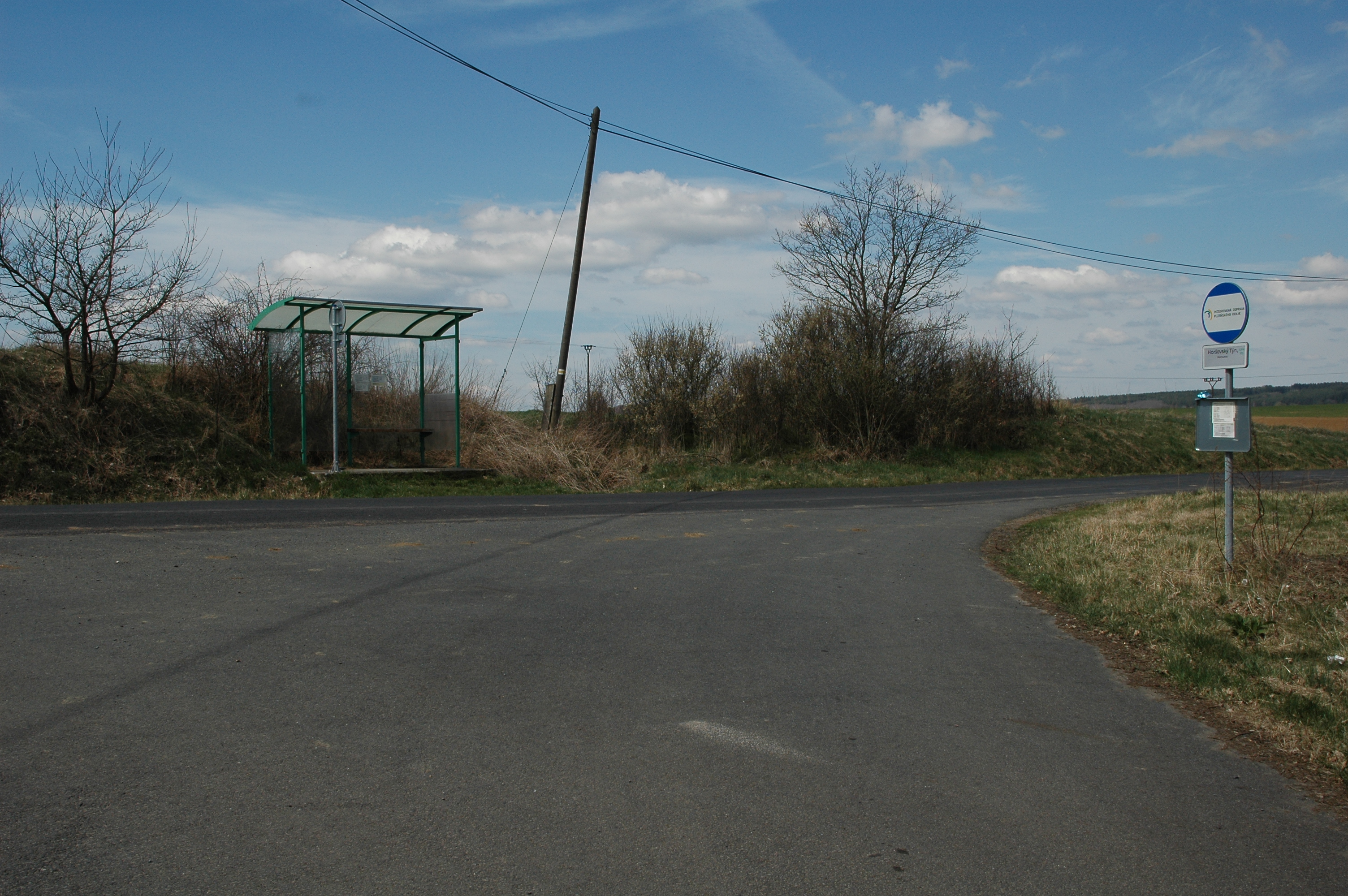
A bus stop

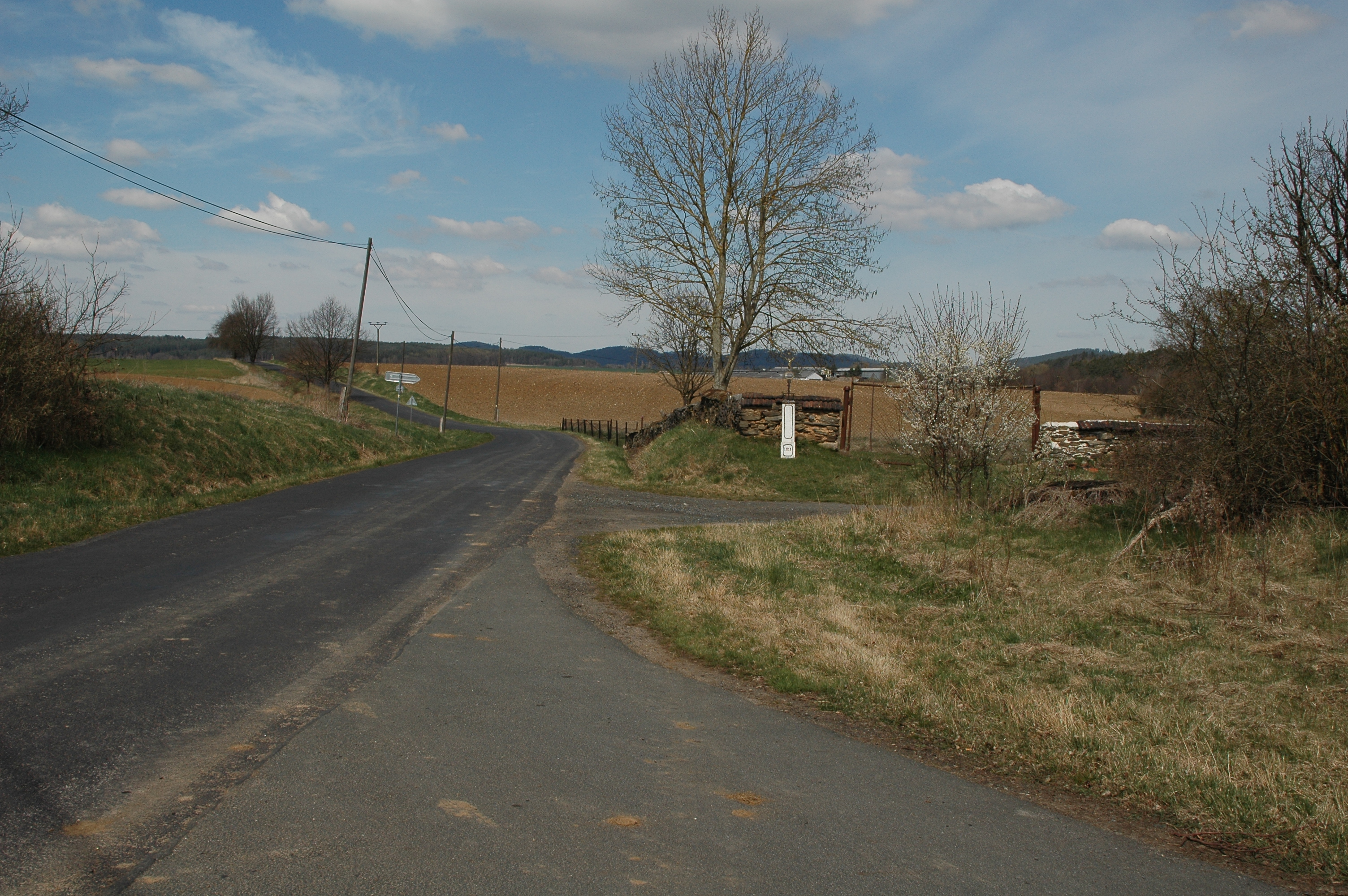
Main road to Dolní Metelsko

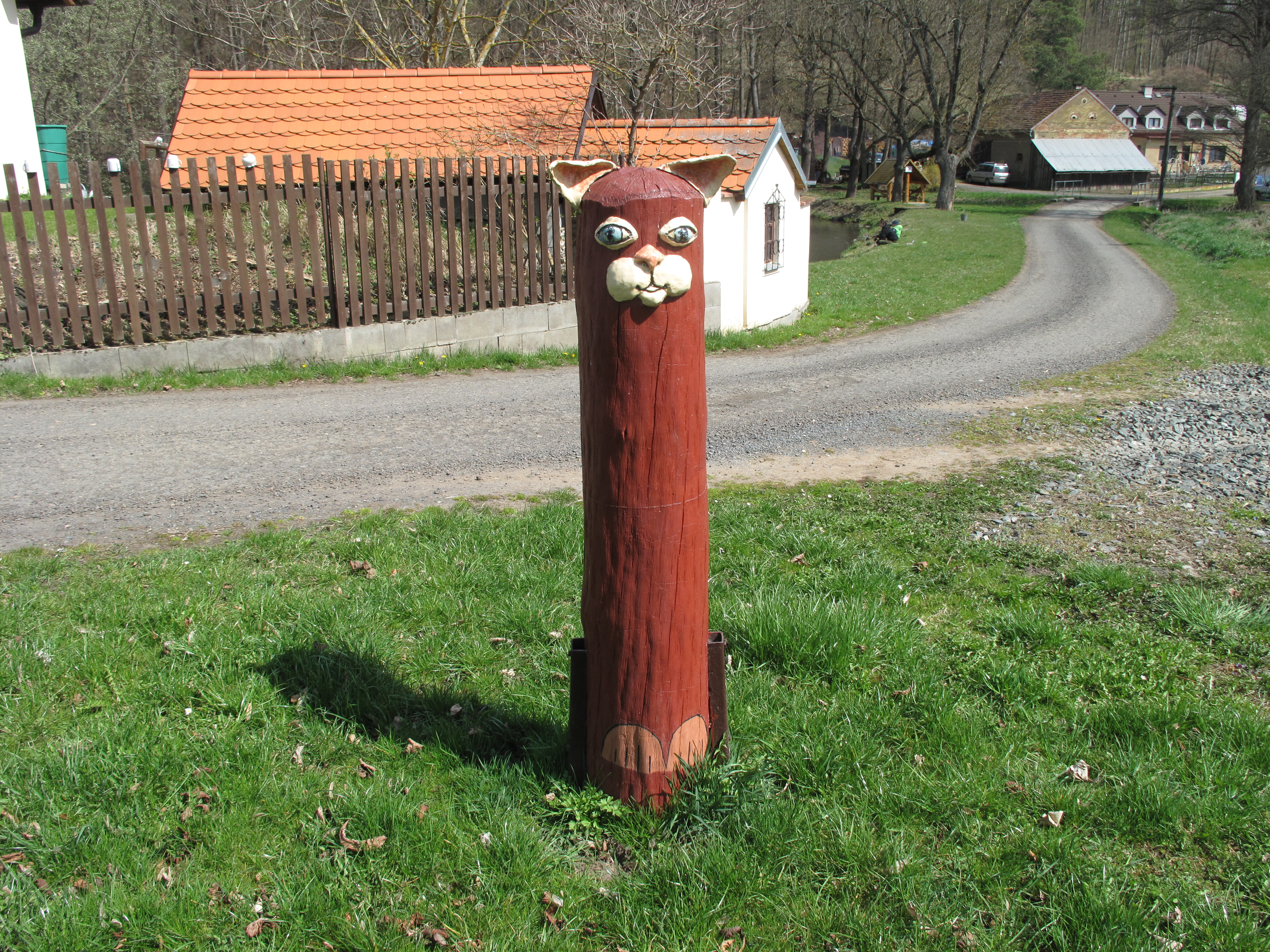
Wooden sculpture of a cat at the village square
