= Valdorf =

- Village
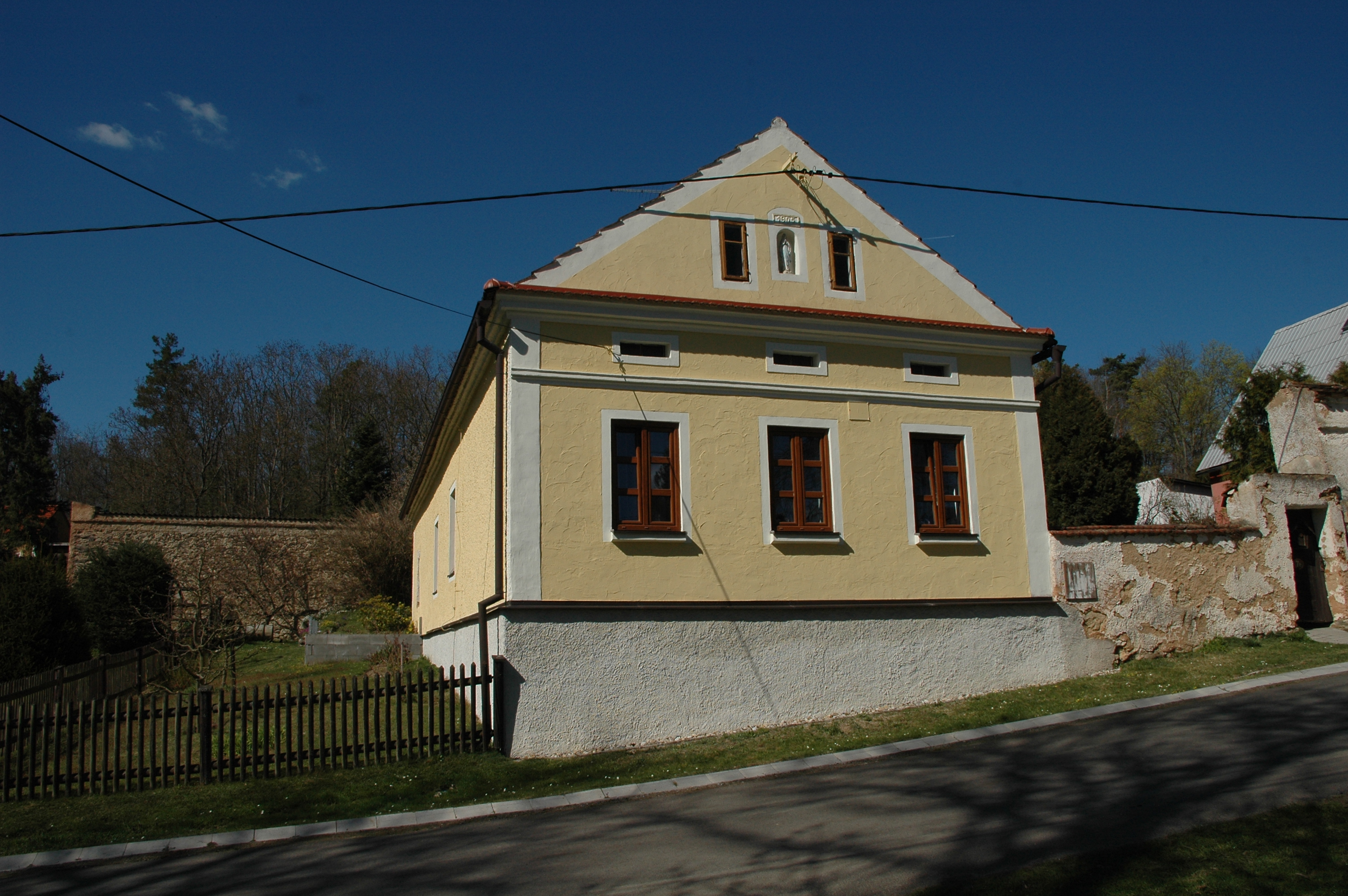
- A house in Horní Valdorf

- Location in the Czech Republic
- Coordinates: 49°30′15″N 12°56′3″E
- Country: Czech Republic
- Region: Plzeň
- District: Domažlice
- Municipality: Horšovský Týn
- First mentioned: 1789

Area
  - Total: 3.64 km^{2} (1.41 sq mi)
- Elevation: 425 m (1,394 ft)

Population (2021)
  - Total: 23
  - Density: 6.3/km^{2} (16/sq mi)
- Time zone: UTC+1 (CET)
  - Summer (DST): UTC+2 (CEST)
- Postal code: 346 01

Valdorf is a village and administrative part of Horšovský Týn in Domažlice District, the Czech Republic. It has about 20 inhabitants. It is formed by two urbanistically separated parts: Dolní Valdorf and Horní Valdorf.

== History ==
The first written mention of Valdorf is from 1789. Between 1869 and 1960 it was a hamlet of Horšovský Týn and in 1961 it became part of that town. In 1870 its inhabitants were predominantly German.

== Description ==
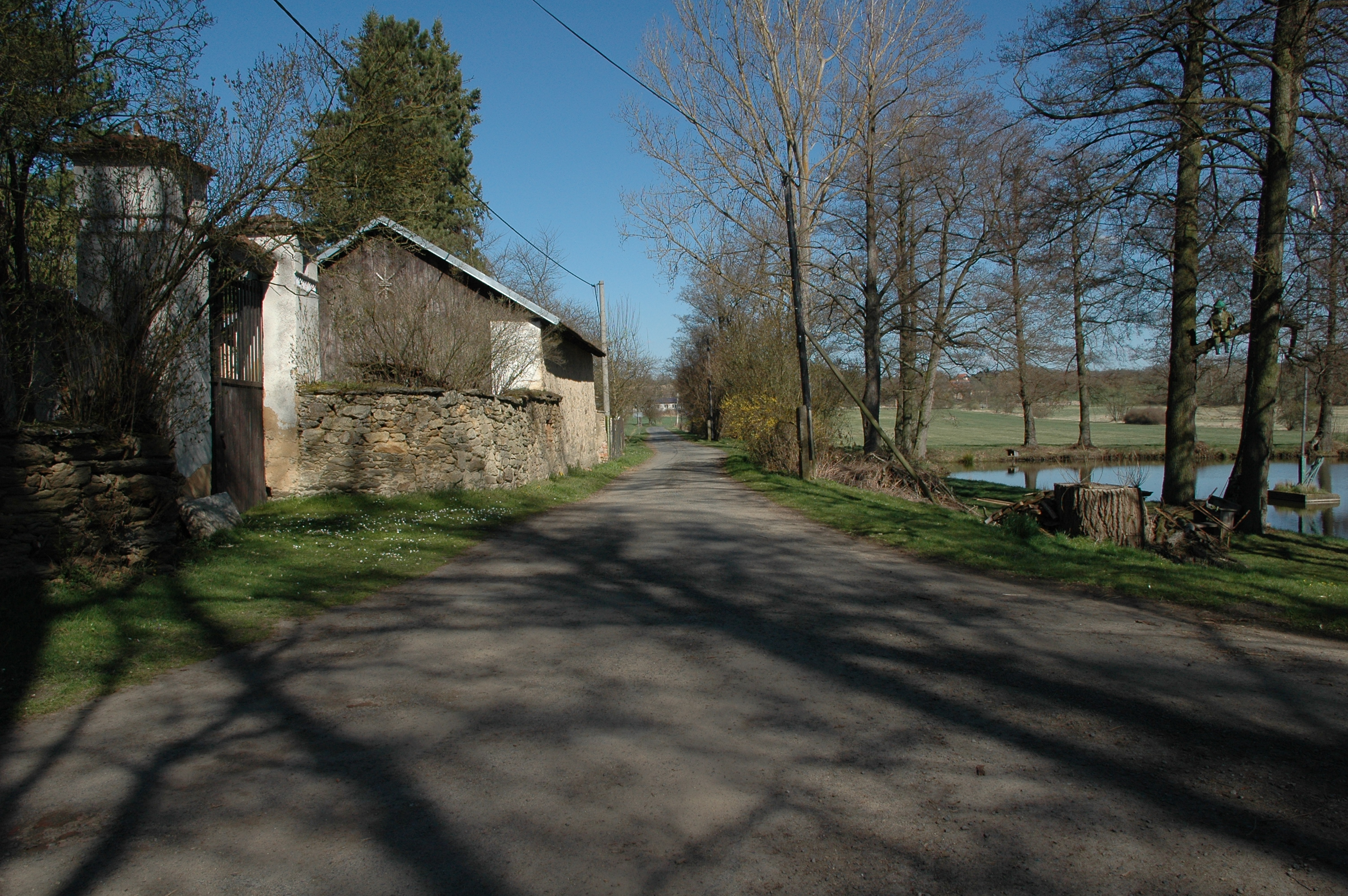
A road in Dolní Valdorf

The village of Valdorf is located south of Horšovský Týn near the Podháj hill. The road connecting Němčice and Horšovský Týn divides it into two parts: Dolní (Lower, in the west) and Horní (Upper, in the east) Valdorf.

Dolní Valdorf is located at the foot of the Podháj hill on the Podhájský stream. It consists of several cottages that stand by the pond. In the middle of the village, there is a crossroads, the neo-Gothic chapel of the Holy Family, and the wayside shrine. A green tourist route connecting Horšovský Týn and Domažlice passes through Dolní Valdorf from north to south.

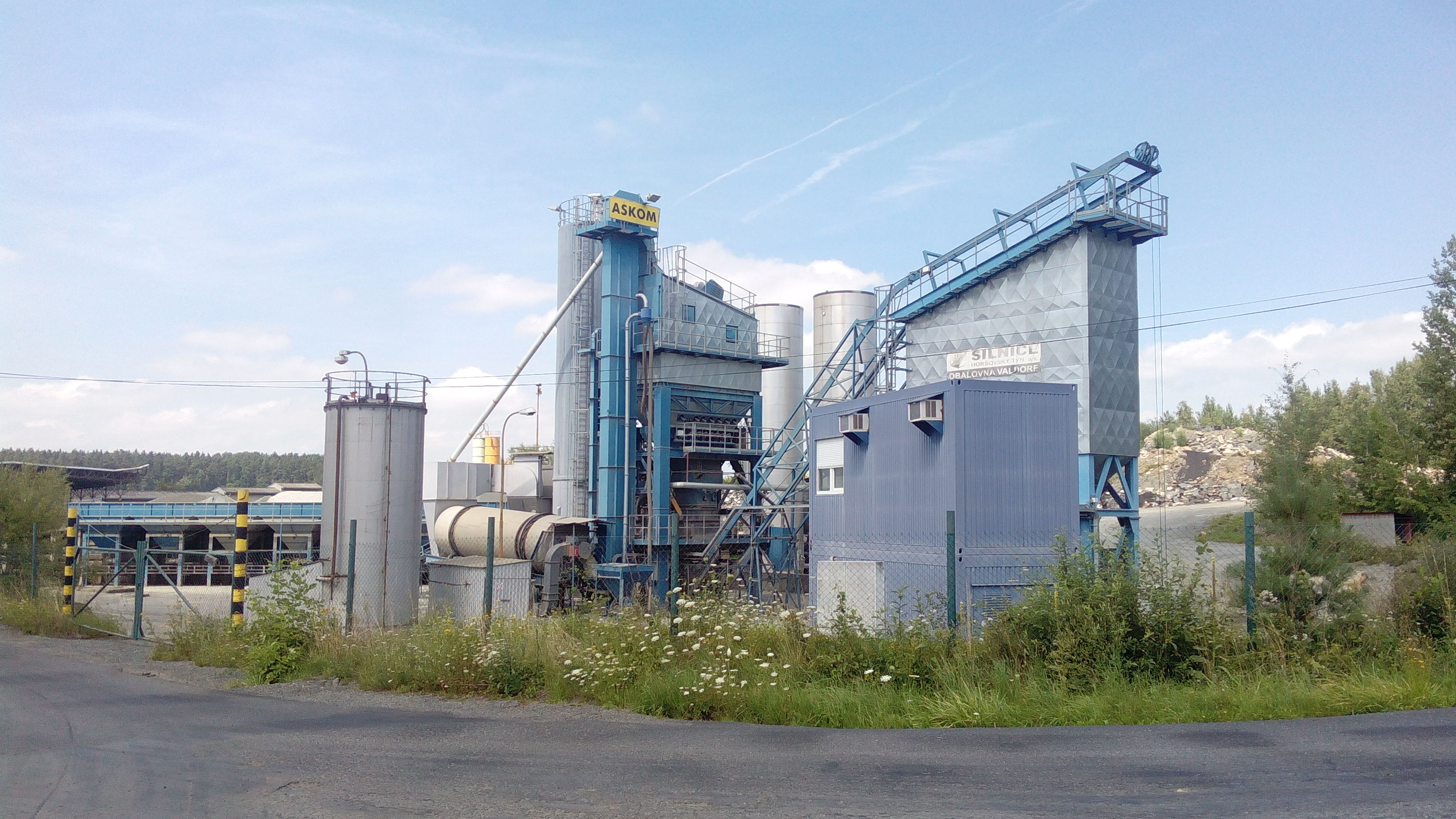
Materials spreading factory at the crossroads between both parts of the village

Horní Valdorf is located on the opposite side of the hill. A path passes through its center and climbs up to elevation 447, where the cross is located. Most of the buildings are scattered along this road. Below this part, there are three ponds in the valley on the stream.

Between the individual built-up parts, there are fields and meadows, and at the crossing of the roads there is a cross, there is a factory of spreading materials.
