= Czech Tourist Club =

Hiking club

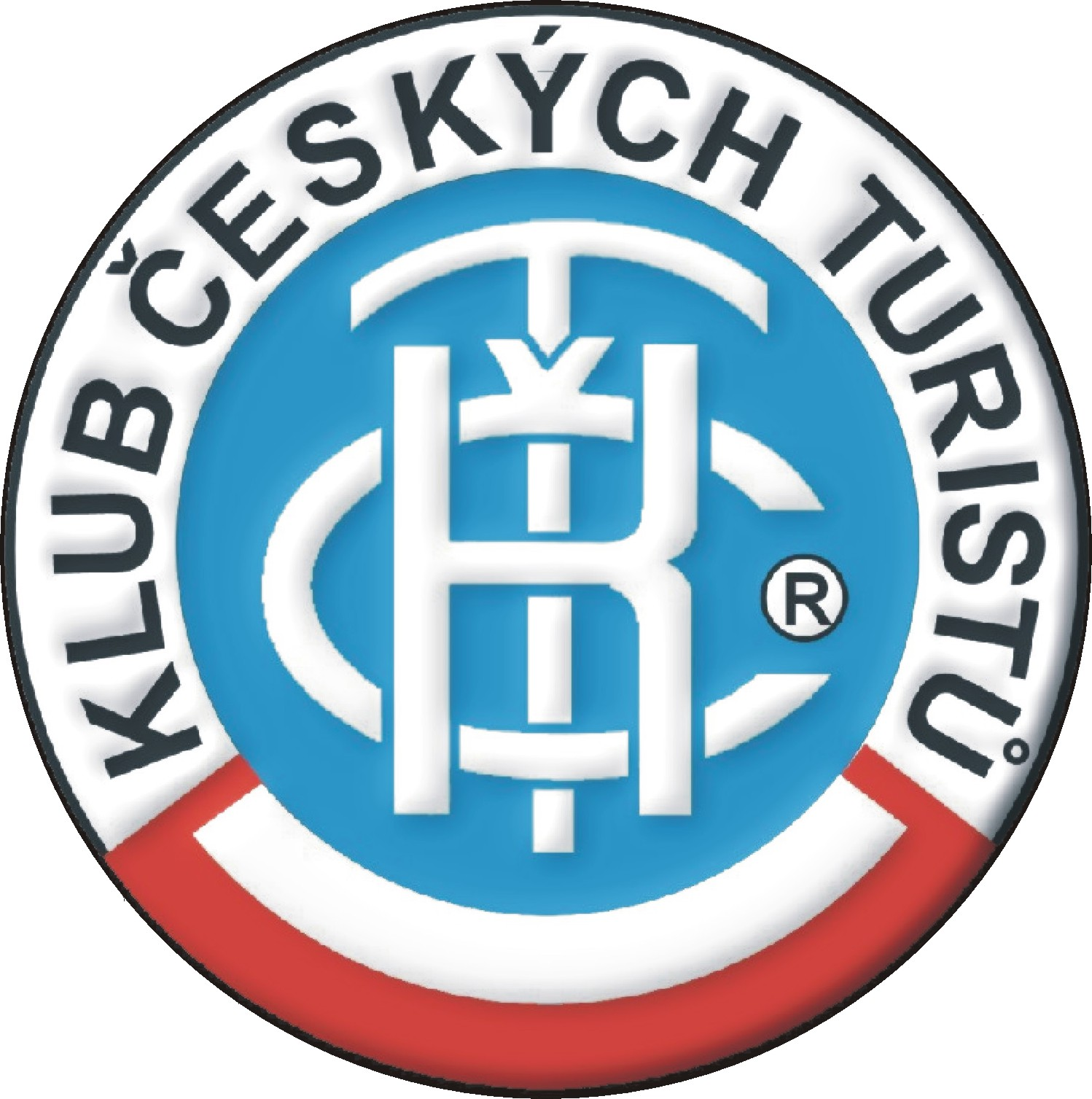
Czech Hiking Club logo

Czech Tourist Club (Czech: Klub českých turistů, KČT), known also as Czech Hiking Club was created in 1888. With over 40,000 members, the Czech Hiking Club is a large organisation responsible for maintaining the dense Czech Hiking Markers System.

Between 1920 and 1938 it was replaced by the Czechoslovak Tourists' Club. During the Nazi occupation it was one of the components of the Board for Youth Education in Bohemia and Moravia. Between 1948 and 1990, it existed as the Tourism Association within the Czechoslovak Union of Physical Education and Sport. In 1990 it resumed independent activity.
