= Horšovský Týn =

- Town
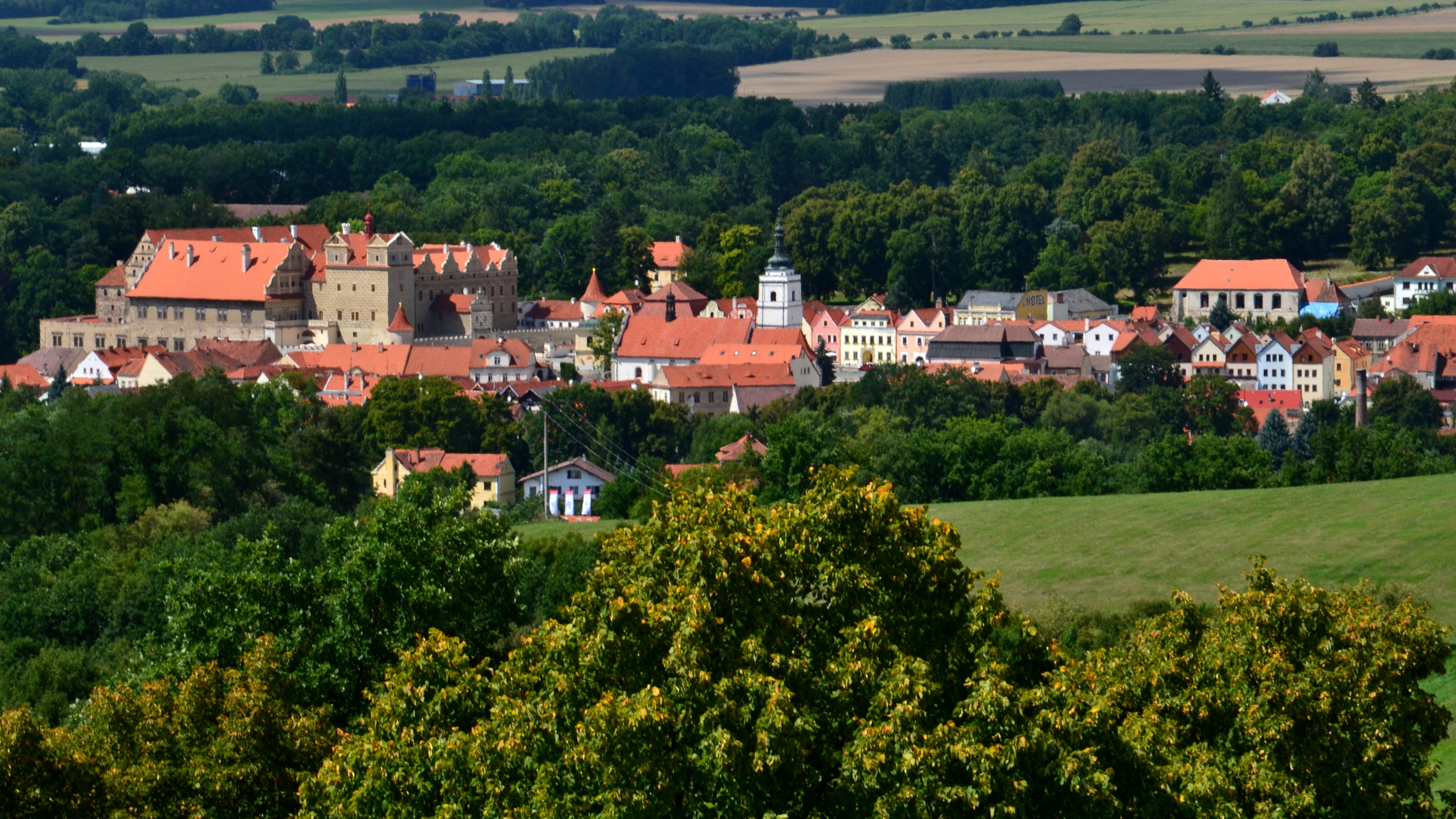
- General view of the town

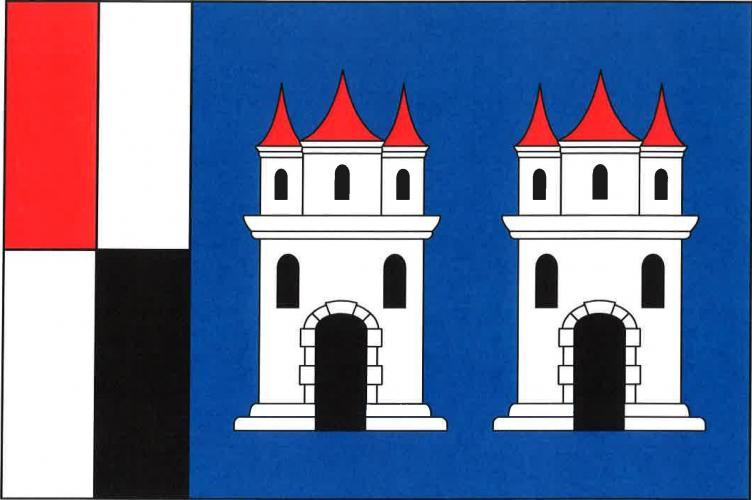
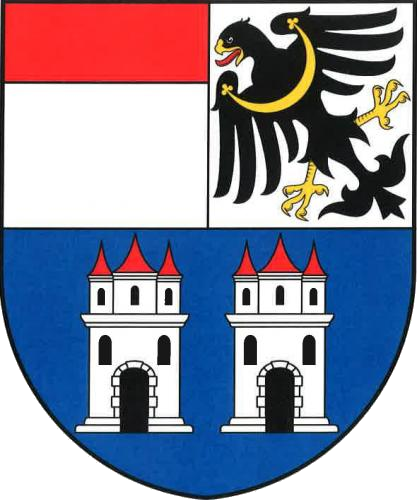
- Flag Coat of arms

- Location in the Czech Republic
- Coordinates: 49°31′47″N 12°56′39″E
- Country: Czech Republic
- Region: Plzeň
- District: Domažlice
- First mentioned: 1184

Government
  - Mayor: Josef Holeček

Area
  - Total: 71.31 km^{2} (27.53 sq mi)
- Elevation: 376 m (1,234 ft)

Population (2026-01-01)
  - Total: 5,098
  - Density: 71.49/km^{2} (185.2/sq mi)
- Time zone: UTC+1 (CET)
  - Summer (DST): UTC+2 (CEST)
- Postal codes: 345 25, 346 01
- Website: www.horsovskytyn.cz

Horšovský Týn (Czech pronunciation: [ˈhorʃofskiː ˈtiːn]; German: Bischofteinitz) is a town in Domažlice District in the Plzeň Region of the Czech Republic. It has about 5,100 inhabitants. The town is located on the Radbuza River, on the border between the Plasy Uplands and Podčeskoleská Hills.

Horšovský Týn was founded in the 12th century at the latest and became a town in the 14th century. The historic town centre is well preserved and is protected as an urban monument reservation. The main landmark of the town is the Horšovský Týn Castle, which is protected as a national cultural monument.

== Administrative division ==
Horšovský Týn consists of 20 municipal parts (in brackets population according to the 2021 census):

- Borovice (25)
- Dolní Metelsko (87)
- Hašov (23)
- Horní Metelsko (41)
- Horšov (169)
- Kocourov (31)
- Malé Předměstí (1,936)
- Město (396)
- Nová Ves (41)
- Oplotec (48)
- Plzeňské Předměstí (528)
- Podhájí (0)
- Podražnice (51)
- Semošice (167)
- Svatá Anna (2)
- Svinná (4)
- Tasnovice (74)
- Valdorf (23)
- Velké Předměstí (1,030)
- Věvrov (19)

The urban core is formed by Malé Předměstí, Město, Plzeňské Předměstí and Velké Předměstí.

== Etymology ==
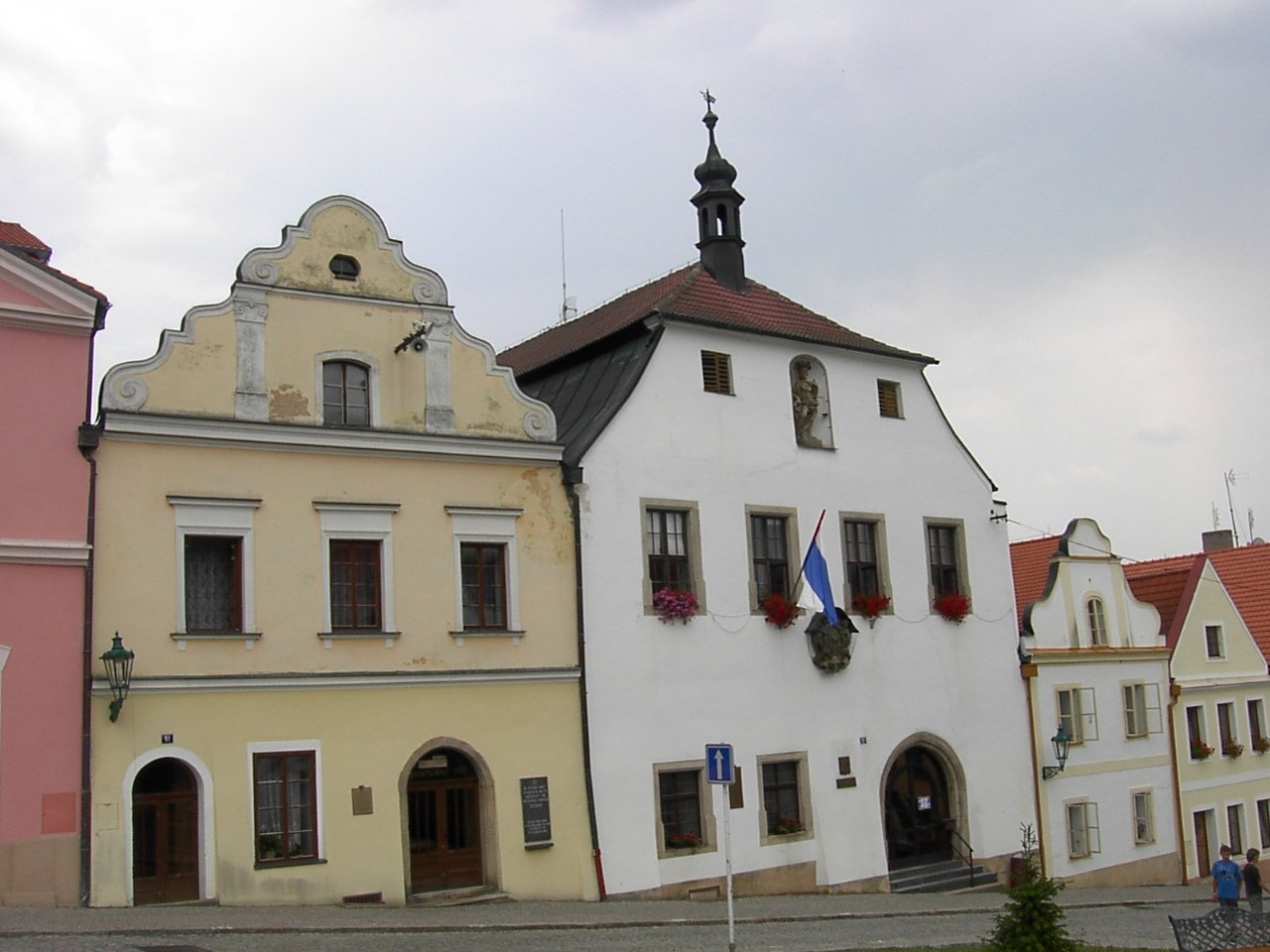
Town hall

The Old Czech word týn is related to English 'town'. It was a term for a fortified settlement. The settlement was administered from Horšov (today a part of Horšovský Týn), hence the name which means "Horšov's Týn".

== Geography ==
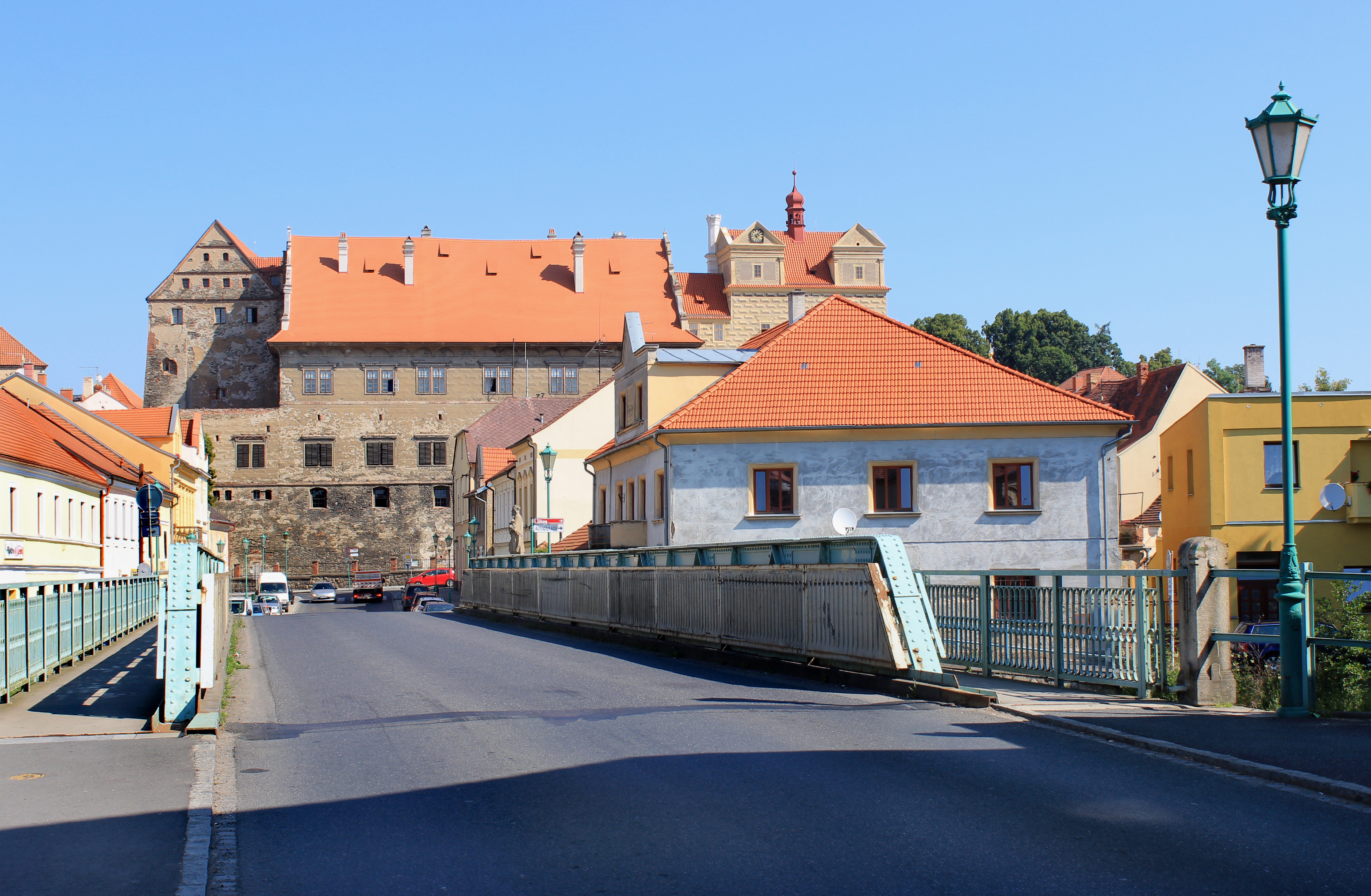
Bridge over the Radbuza River and Horšovský Týn Castle

Horšovský Týn is located about 9 kilometres (6 mi) north of Domažlice and 37 km (23 mi) southwest of Plzeň. It lies on the border between the Plasy Uplands and Podčeskoleská Hills. The highest point is at 520 m (1,706 ft) above sea level. The Radbuza River flows through the town.

== History ==
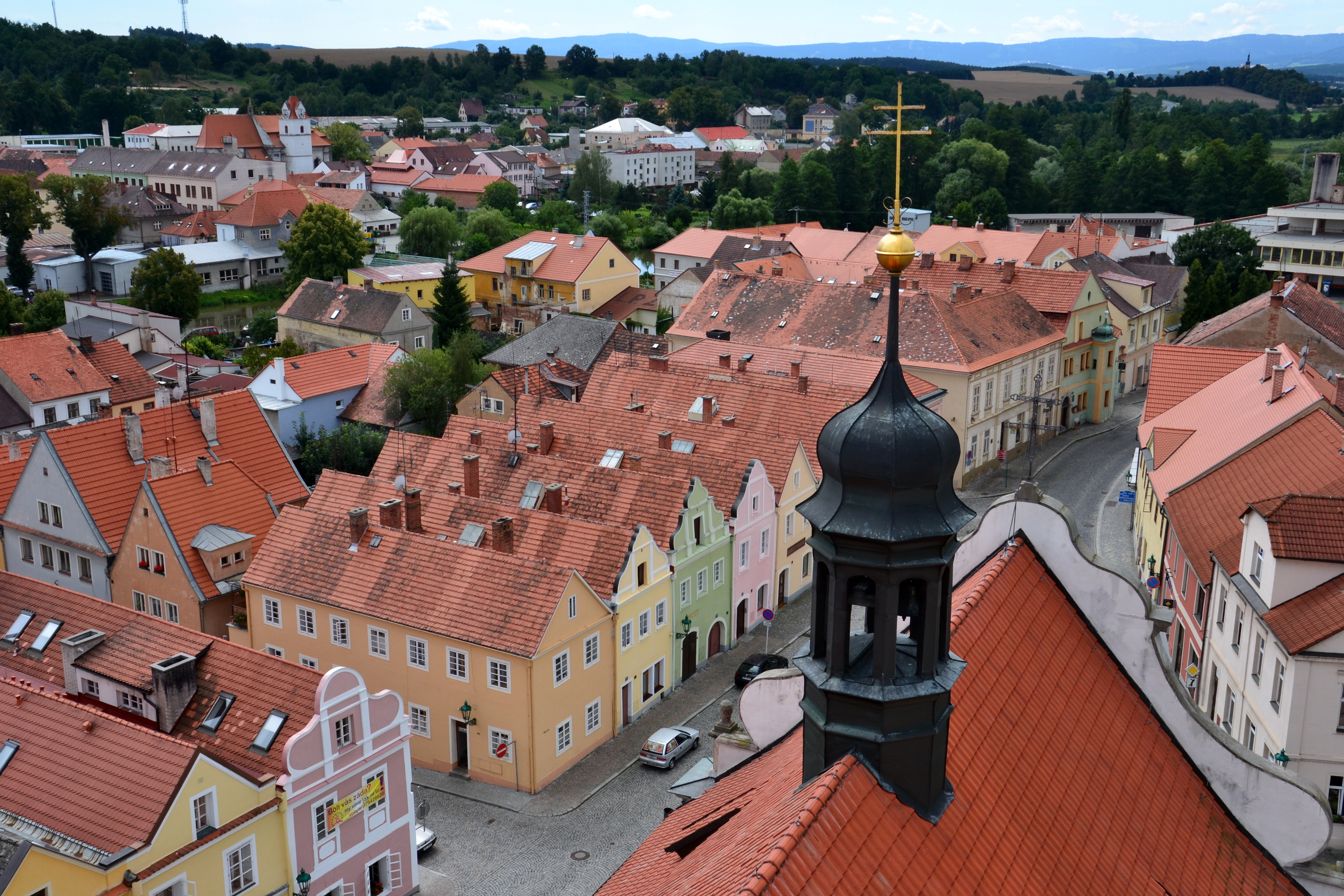
Southwestern part of the town square

A merchant village on a trade route from Prague to Regensburg probably existed here in the 10th century. In 973, the area was donated by Duke Boleslaus II to the newly established bishopric of Prague. The first written mention of Horšovský Týn is from 1184.

A settlement was established on the right bank of the Radbuza river and administered from nearby Horšov. In the mid-13th century, it became more important than Horšov, a castle was built here, and it became the seat of the estate. King Charles IV, promoted the village to a town and allowed to build fortification walls. The walls were not built around the entire perimeter of the town, and so the town was besieged and conquered during the Hussite Wars between 1422 and 1431.

In 1542, the Lobkowicz family bought the Horšovský Týn estate. Thanks to the business activities of the family, the estate became one of the ten largest estates in Bohemia at the turn of the 16th and 17th centuries. After the fire in 1547, the town was rebuilt in the Renaissance style. Horšovský Týn was confiscated from the Lobkowicz family after the Bohemian Revolt in 1620.

After the Thirty Years' War, Horšovský Týn passed to the Counts of Trauttmansdorff, in whose possession the castle remained until 1945. In the second half of the 17th century and in the 18th century, the town was Germanised. The improving economic situation was reflected in the character of the town. The buildings were given a Baroque and Rococo appearance, which has been preserved in the historical centre to this day.

In 1900, the railway to the town was built. During the late 19th century and especially after 1918, Czechs began moving into the district in large numbers. After the end of World War I in 1918, the town became part of the Czechoslovakia.

From 1938 to 1945, the town and the region were annexed into Nazi Germany and administered as part of the Reichsgau Sudetenland. After World War II, it became part of Czechoslovakia again and the German-speaking population was expelled.

== Demographics ==
Historical population

Year	Pop.	±%
1869	4,851	—
1880	5,168	+6.5%
1890	4,942	−4.4%
1900	4,791	−3.1%
1910	5,148	+7.5%

Year	Pop.	±%
1921	5,250	+2.0%
1930	5,179	−1.4%
1950	3,805	−26.5%
1961	4,094	+7.6%
1970	4,052	−1.0%

Year	Pop.	±%
1980	4,966	+22.6%
1991	5,047	+1.6%
2001	4,938	−2.2%
2011	4,924	−0.3%
2021	4,781	−2.9%

Source: Censuses

== Transport ==
The I/26 road from Plzeň to the Czech–German border runs through Horšovský Týn.

== Sights ==
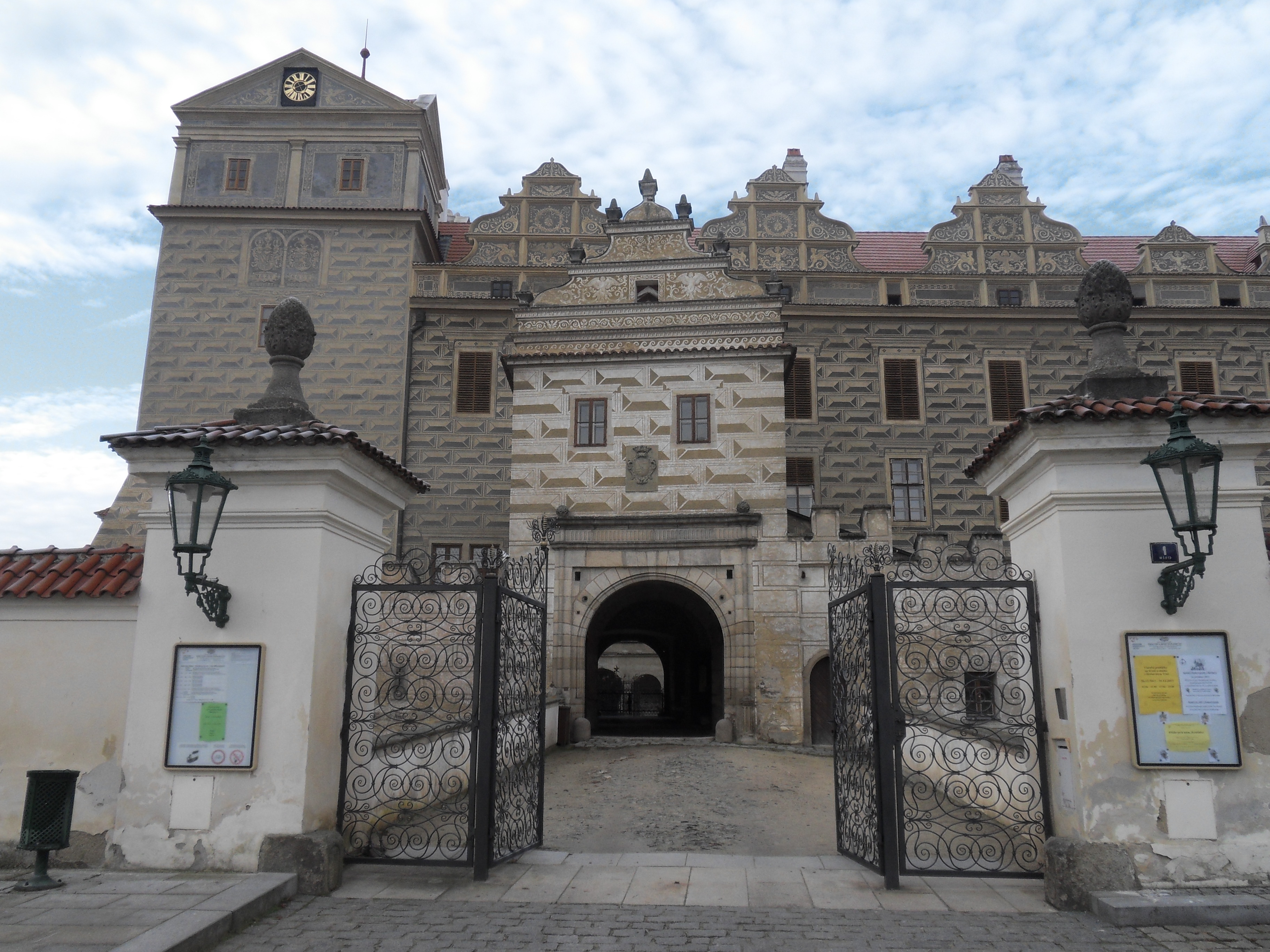
Horšovský Týn Castle

=== Horšovský Týn Castle ===
The main landmark is the Horšovský Týn Castle. It was originally an early Gothic castle. After it was damaged by a fire in 1547, it was rebuilt into a modern Renaissance residence in 1550. The castle is valuable because it was not rebuilt after that. Much of the original Gothic castle, the palace portals and some rooms have also been preserved. For its value, the castle is protected as a national cultural monument.

The castle includes an almost 40 ha (99 acres) large castle park. The Italian-style Renaissance gardens from 1550 were rebuilt into an English park in 1880. In 1905, it was converted into a landscaped park. The park contain a gloriet, a summer house and a Loreto chapel.

=== Sacral monuments ===
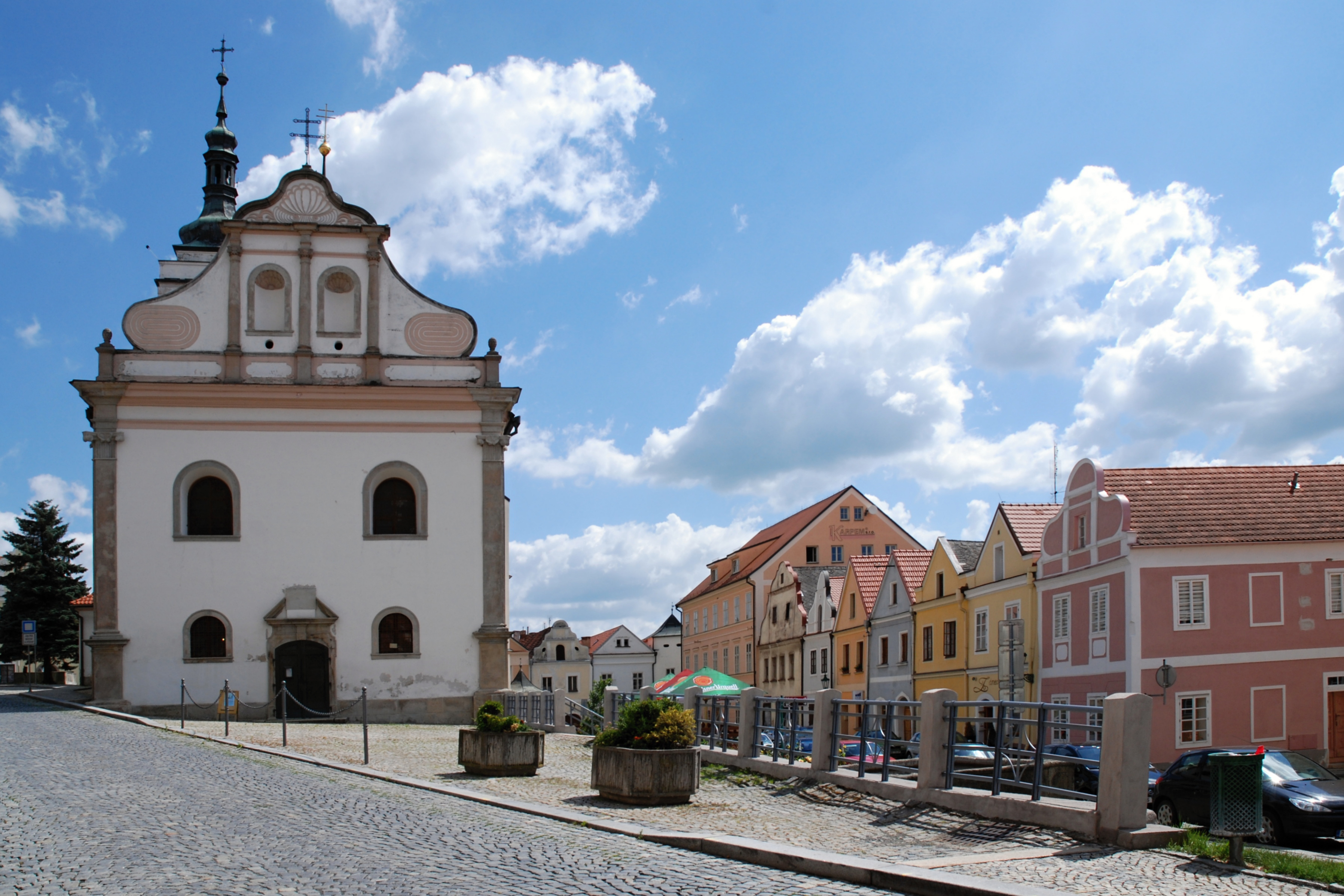
Church of Saints Peter and Paul and burgher houses

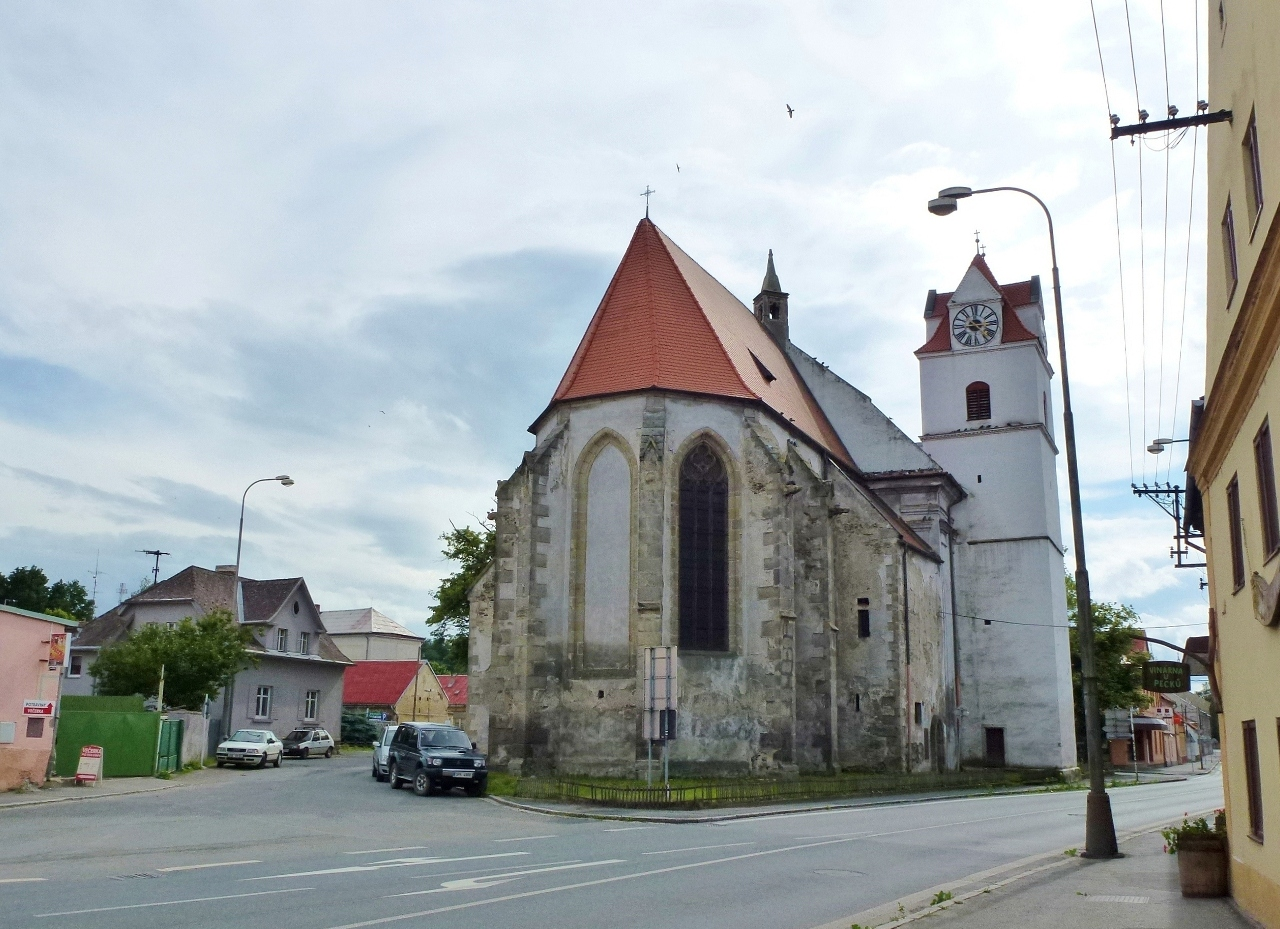
Church of Saint Apollinaris

The Church of All Saints in Horšov is as old as the town and belongs to the most valuable sacral buildings of West Bohemia. The Romanesque church was rebuilt in the Gothic style in the 1360 and retained such a character to this day. The interior was baroque remodelled in 1745.

The Church of Saints Peter and Paul dates from the 15th century. In the early 18th century, it was reconstructed and extended in the Baroque style. The 38 m (125 ft) high bell tower was rebuilt in 1852 and today is open to the public as a lookout tower.

The Church of Saint Apollinaris is a former dean church. It was built in the early Gothic style around 1250 and rebuilt in the second half of the 14th century. The tower was further rebuilt in the 16th century. Before 1768, Baroque modification were made.

Other notable building in the town is the former Capuchin monastery with the Church of Saints Vitus and Adalbert. The monastery complex was built in the early Baroque style in 1650–1654. The last monks left the monastery after World War II. Today the church is unused and the rest of the monastery was converted into apartments.

== Notable people ==
- Raphael Sobiehrd-Mnishovsky (1580–1644), lawyer and writer
- Felix Kadlinský (1613–1675), writer and translator
- Joseph Johann von Littrow (1781–1840), Austrian astronomer
- Josef Steinbach (1879–1937), Austrian weightlifter

== Twin towns – sister cities ==
Horšovský Týn is twinned with:

- Maarkedal, Belgium
- Nabburg, Germany
