= Podhájí =

- Hamlet
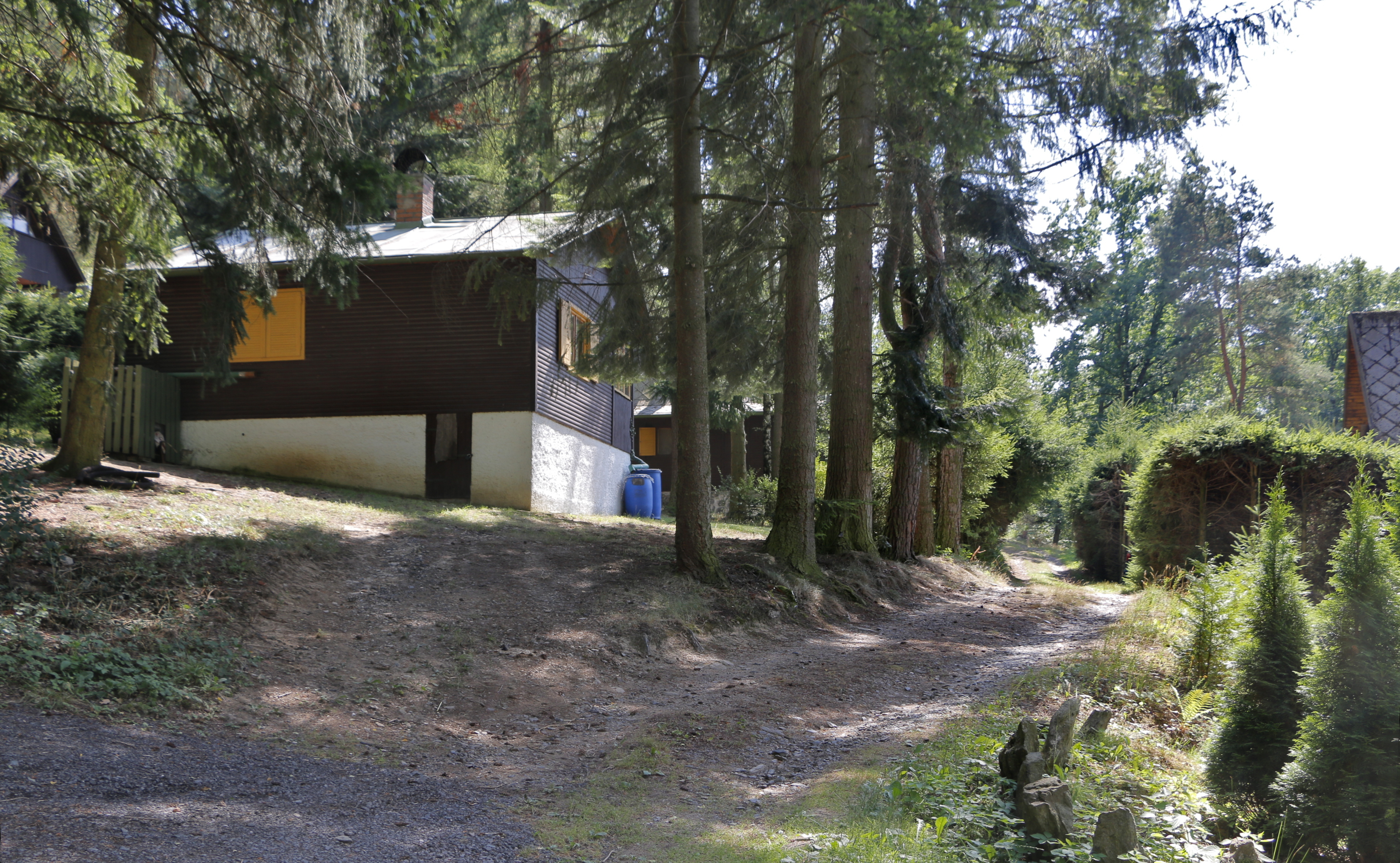
- Eastern part of Podhájí

- Location in the Czech Republic
- Coordinates: 49°30′43″N 12°54′46″E
- Country: Czech Republic
- Region: Plzeň
- District: Domažlice
- Municipality: Horšovský Týn
- Established: 1982

Area
  - Total: 0.75 km^{2} (0.29 sq mi)
- Elevation: 420 m (1,380 ft)

Population (2021)
  - Total: 0
- Time zone: UTC+1 (CET)
  - Summer (DST): UTC+2 (CEST)
- Postal code: 346 01

Podhájí is a hamlet and administrative part of Horšovský Týn in Domažlice District in the Plzeň Region of the Czech Republic. It is located in the southwestern part of Horšovský Týn. As of 2021, it has no permanent inhabitants.

== History ==
Podhájí was set aside as an administrative part of the town in 1982.
