= Felix Kadlinský =

Felix Kadlinský (18 October 1613 in Horšovský Týn – 13 November 1675 in Uherské Hradiště) was a Jesuit, Baroque author and translator into Czech.

In 1635 he joined the Jesuit Order and became a teacher of studia humaniora at the Jesuit college in Jitschin (Jičín) in East Bohemia. From 1639 he was rector for 11 years of the college in Ungarisch-Hradischt (Uherské Hradiště) in Moravia. He produced translations and paraphrases of spiritual works, especially those of the German Jesuit Friedrich Spee, which glorify an idyllic peaceful world, presumably in reaction to the horrors he experienced during the Thirty Years' War.

== Selected publications ==
=== Translations in prose ===
- Zdoroslavíček v kratochvilném hájíčku postavený – paraphrases of the song collection Trutznachtigall ("Rivalling the Nightingale") by Friedrich Spee, his most significant work, containing religious songs and songs glorifying nature
- Zrcadlo bolestné Matky Boží Panny Marie ("Mirror of the suffering Mother of God the Virgin Mary"
- Život a sláva svatého Václava ("Life and fame of Saint Wenceslas")
- Život svaté Ludmily ("Life of Saint Ludmila") (ascribed to Kadlinský)
- Pokladnice duchovní ("Spiritual Treasure-chest") – meditation and observations on withstanding life
- Numerous church texts, partly from the works of Friedrich Spee
- Glaube, Hoffnung, Liebe ("Belief, Hope, Love"), 1662, after Friedrich Spee
