= Věvrov =

Coordinates: 49°34′34″N 12°55′40″E

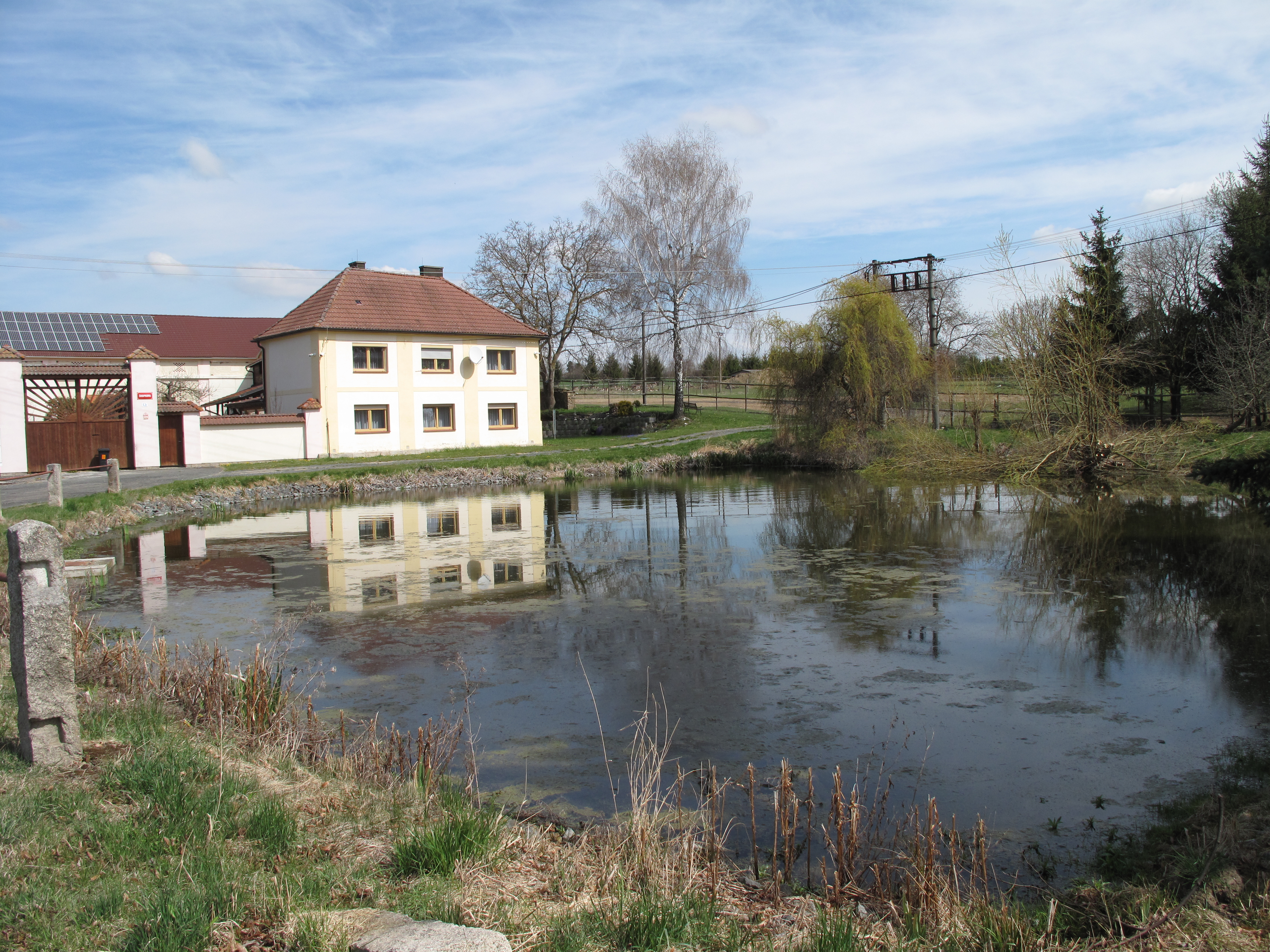
- A farm by the pond
- Interactive map of Věvrov

Věvrov is a village, which belongs to Horšovský Týn, located in Domažlice District, Czech Republic. It has 21 houses designated for living, and there were 20 inhabitants in 2011. The first mention goes back to 1379. It is the birthplace of Maxmilian Reisinger from Reisinger.

== Gallery ==
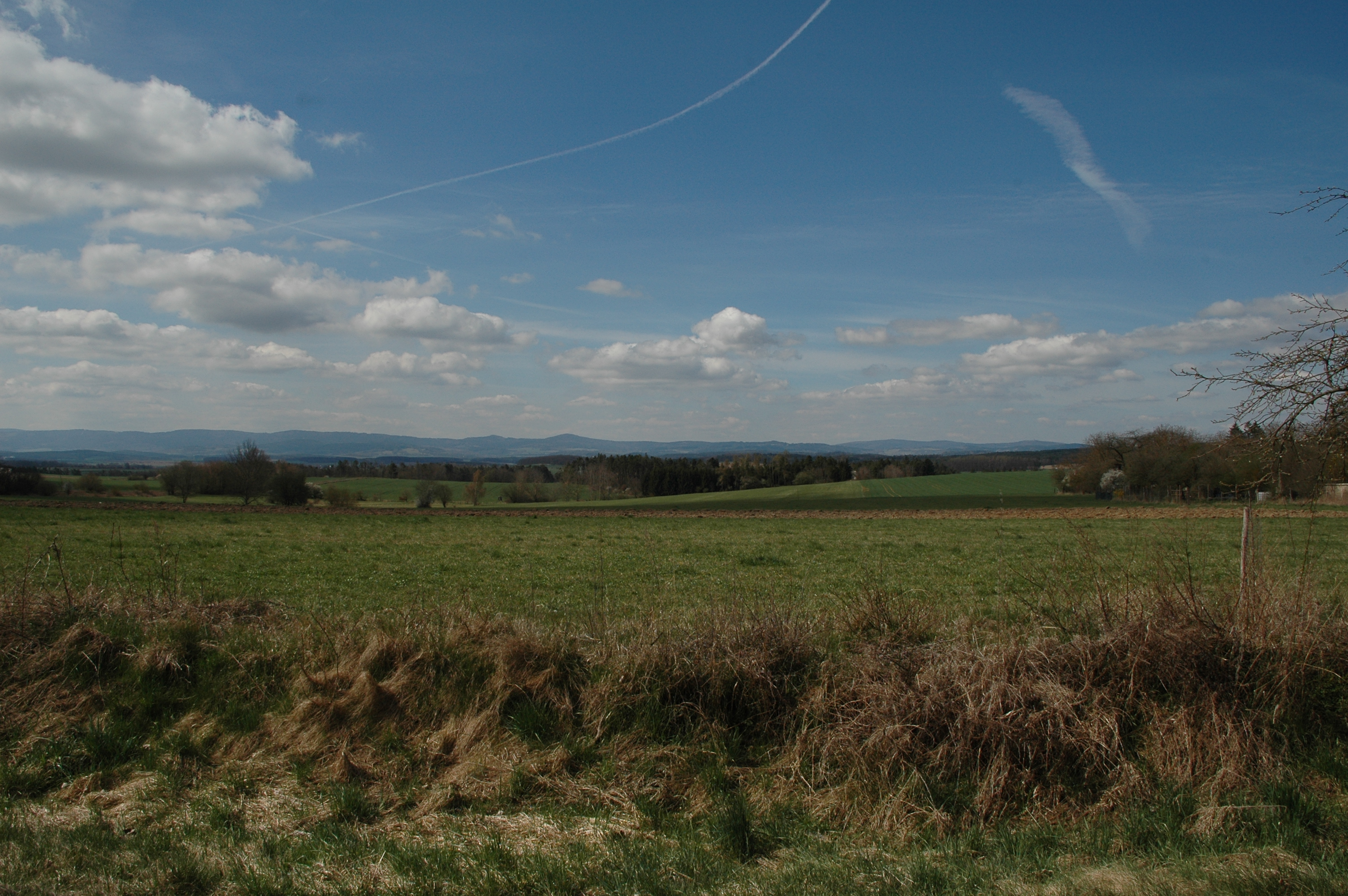
Surrounding countryside

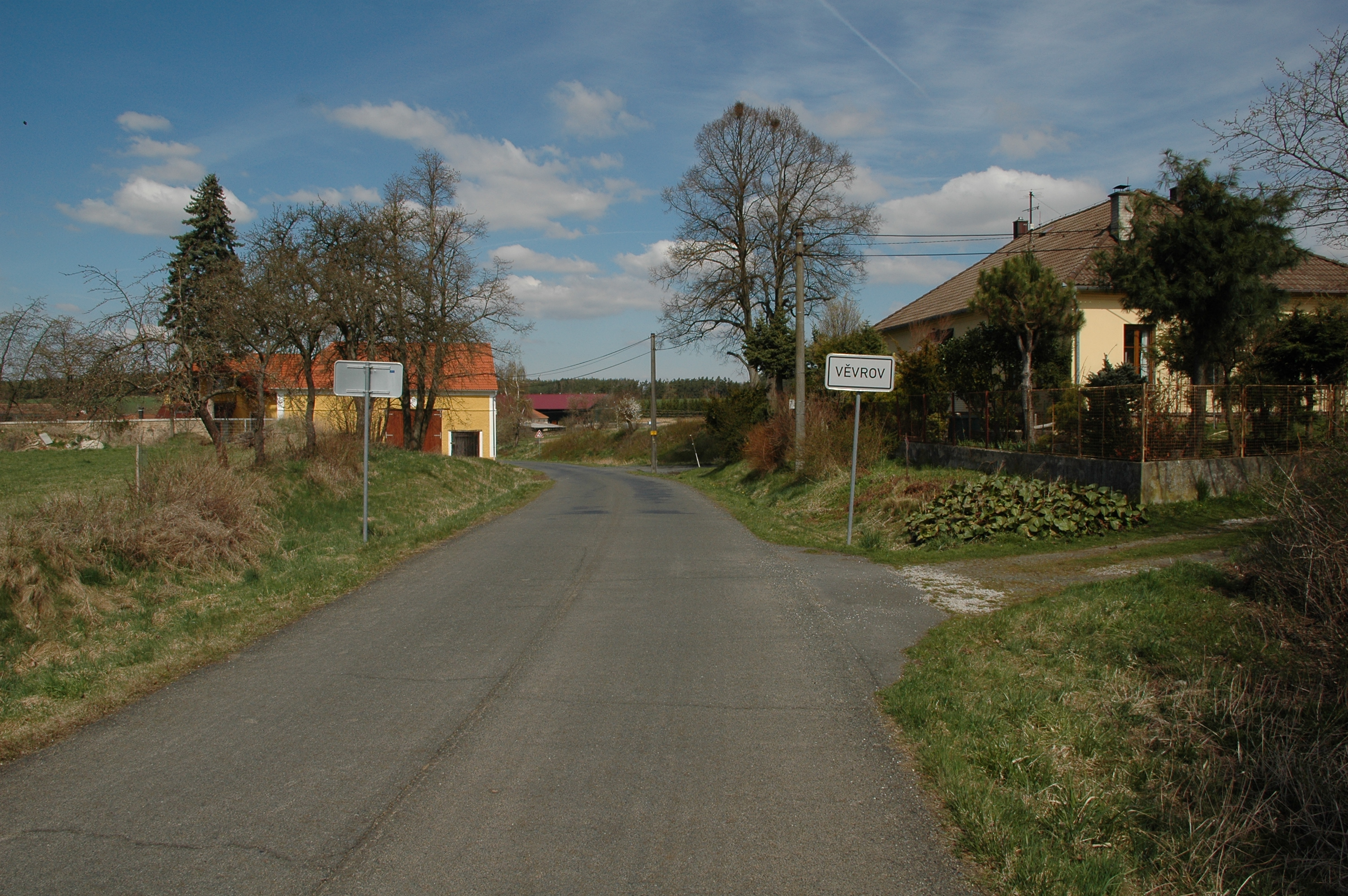
Road to the village

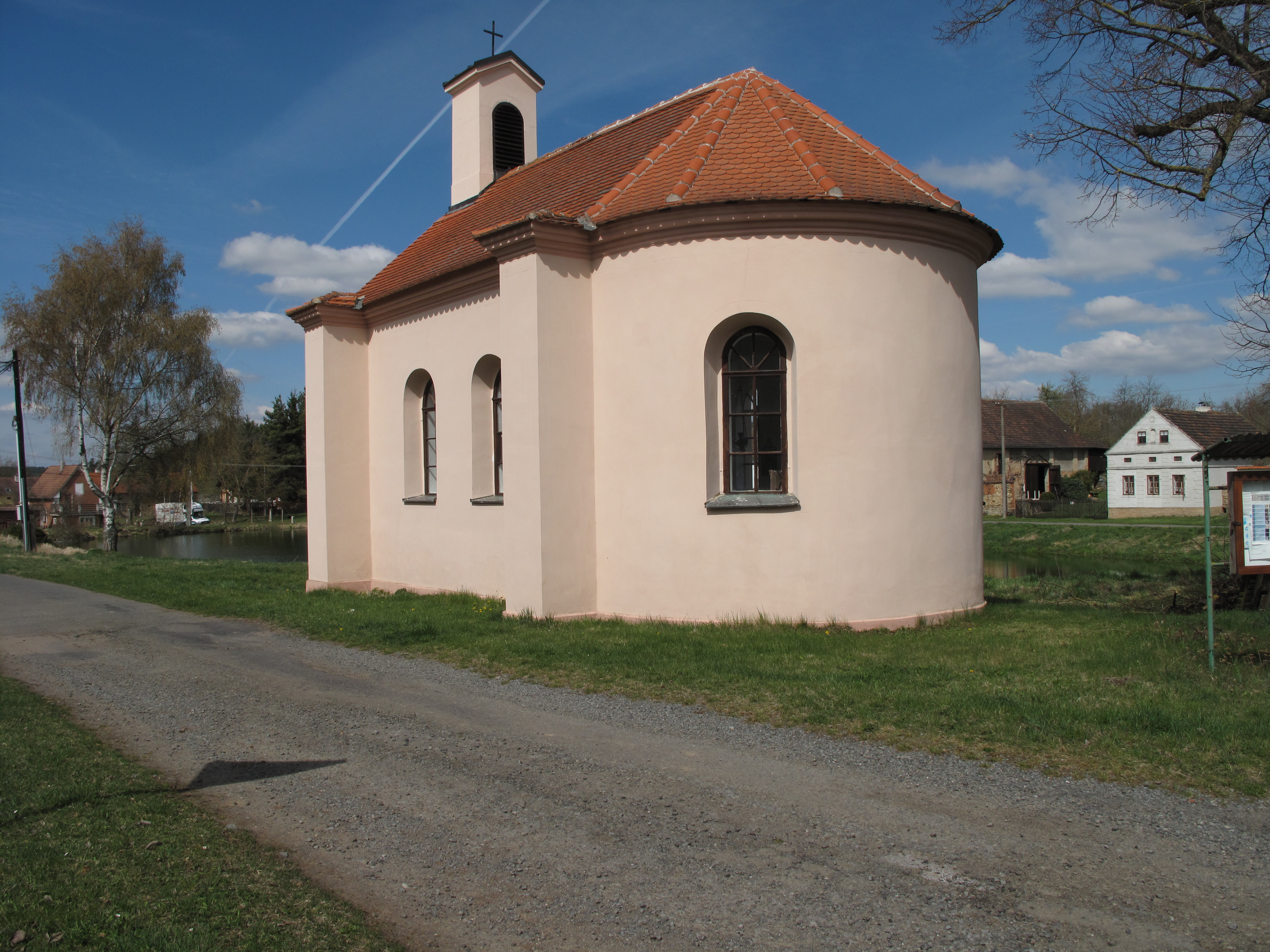
Village chapell
