= Podražnice =

Coordinates: 49°33′17″N 12°57′48″E

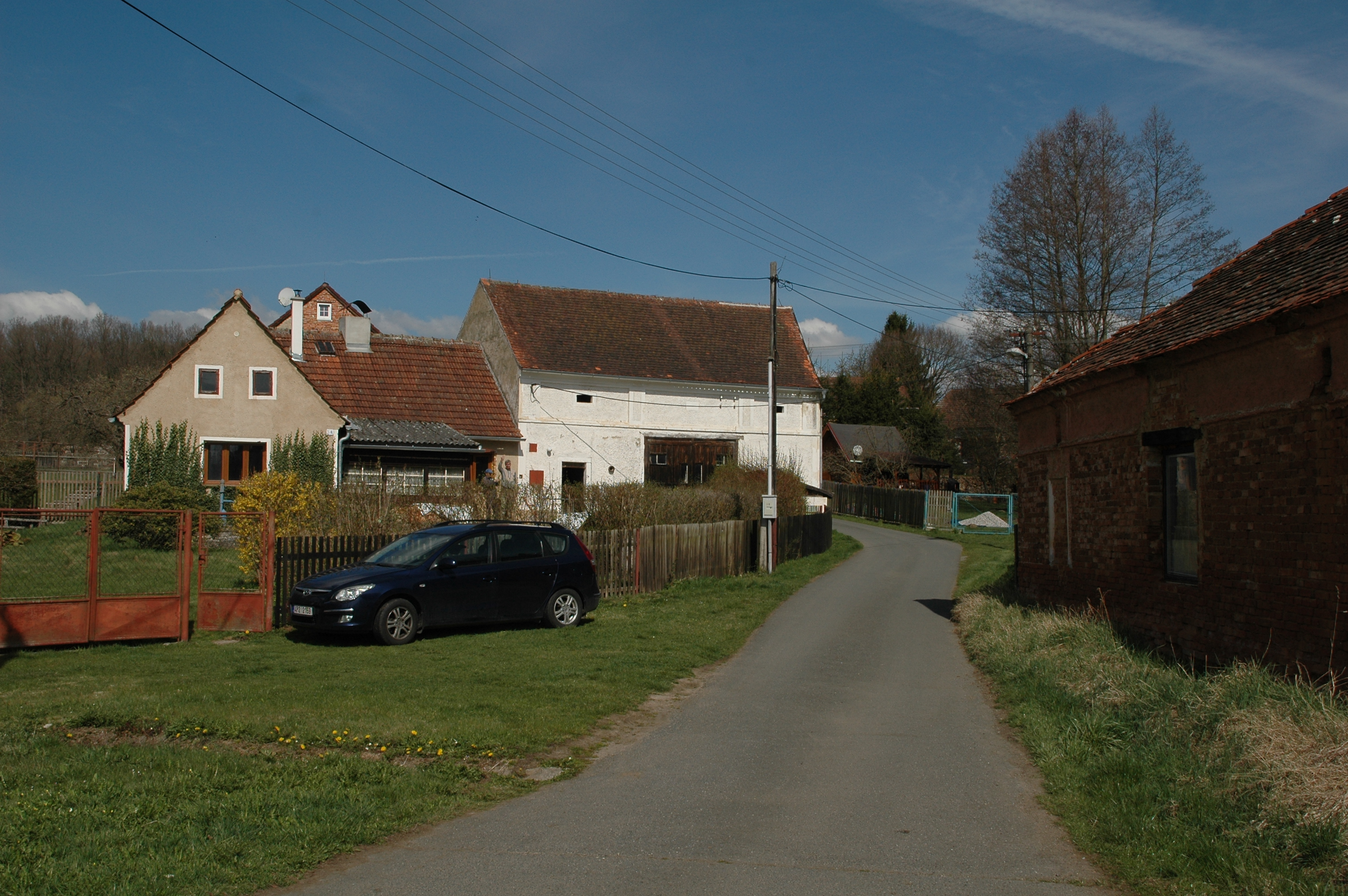
- Houses by the road
- Interactive map of Podražnice

Podražnice is a small village, part of Horšovský Týn, located in Domažlice District, Czech Republic. It has 30 houses designated for living, and in 2011 there were 74 inhabitants. The village was first mentioned in 1312. On the hill on the northeastern edge of the village, there are the heritage-protected remains of the Na Zámku hillfort from the Bronze Age and the Late Iron Age.

== Gallery ==
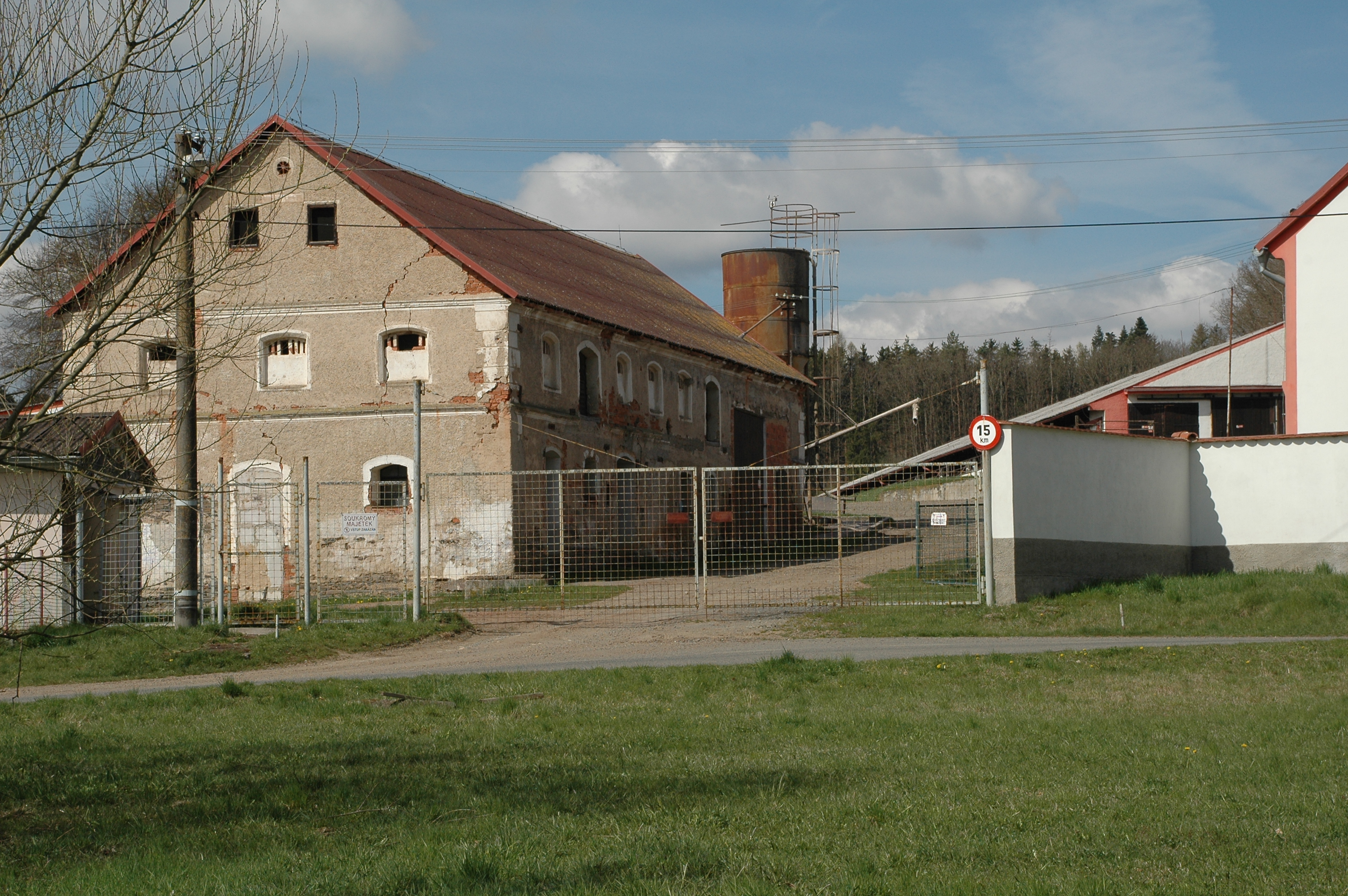
Former collective farm

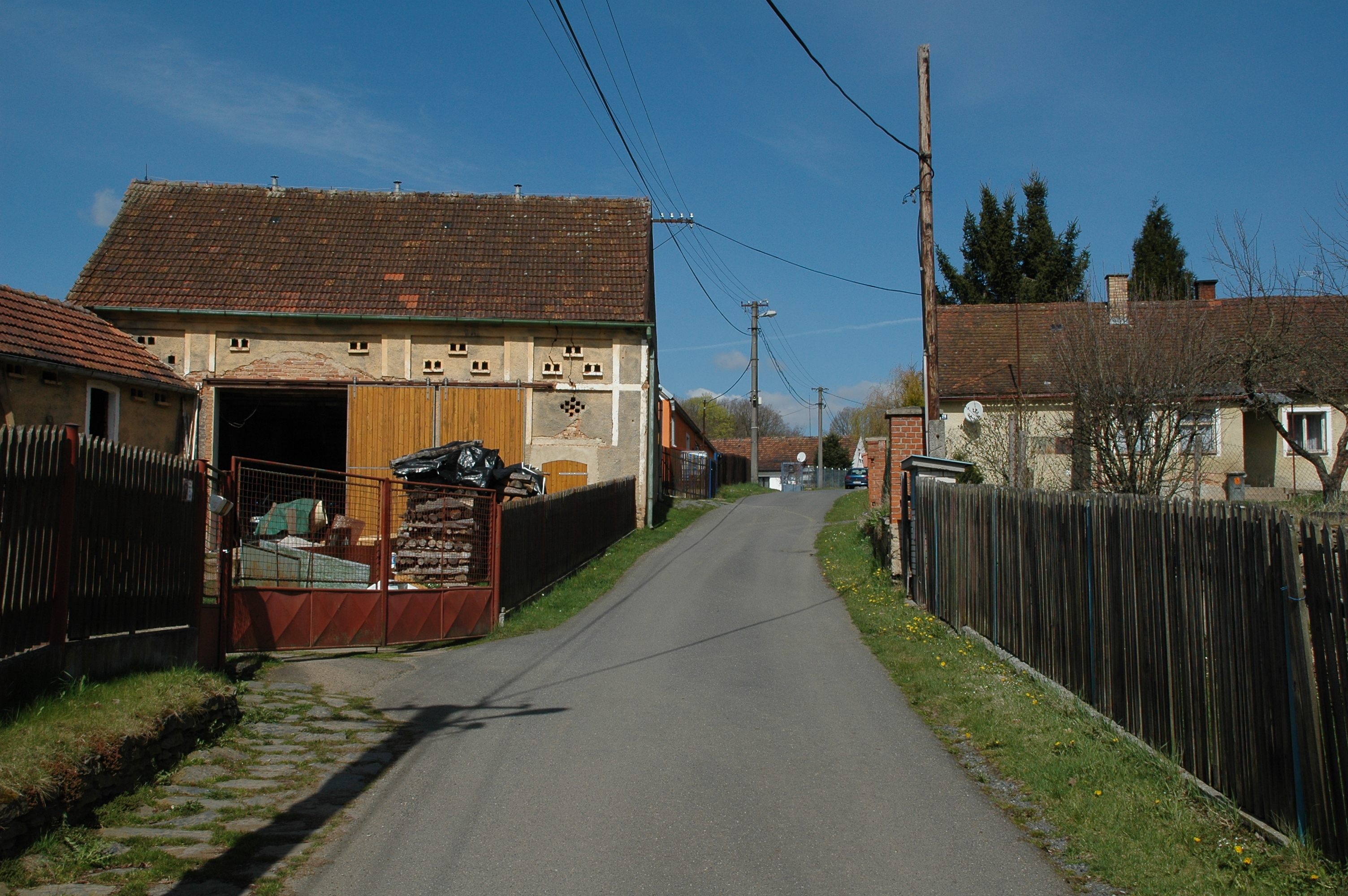
A road and a barn

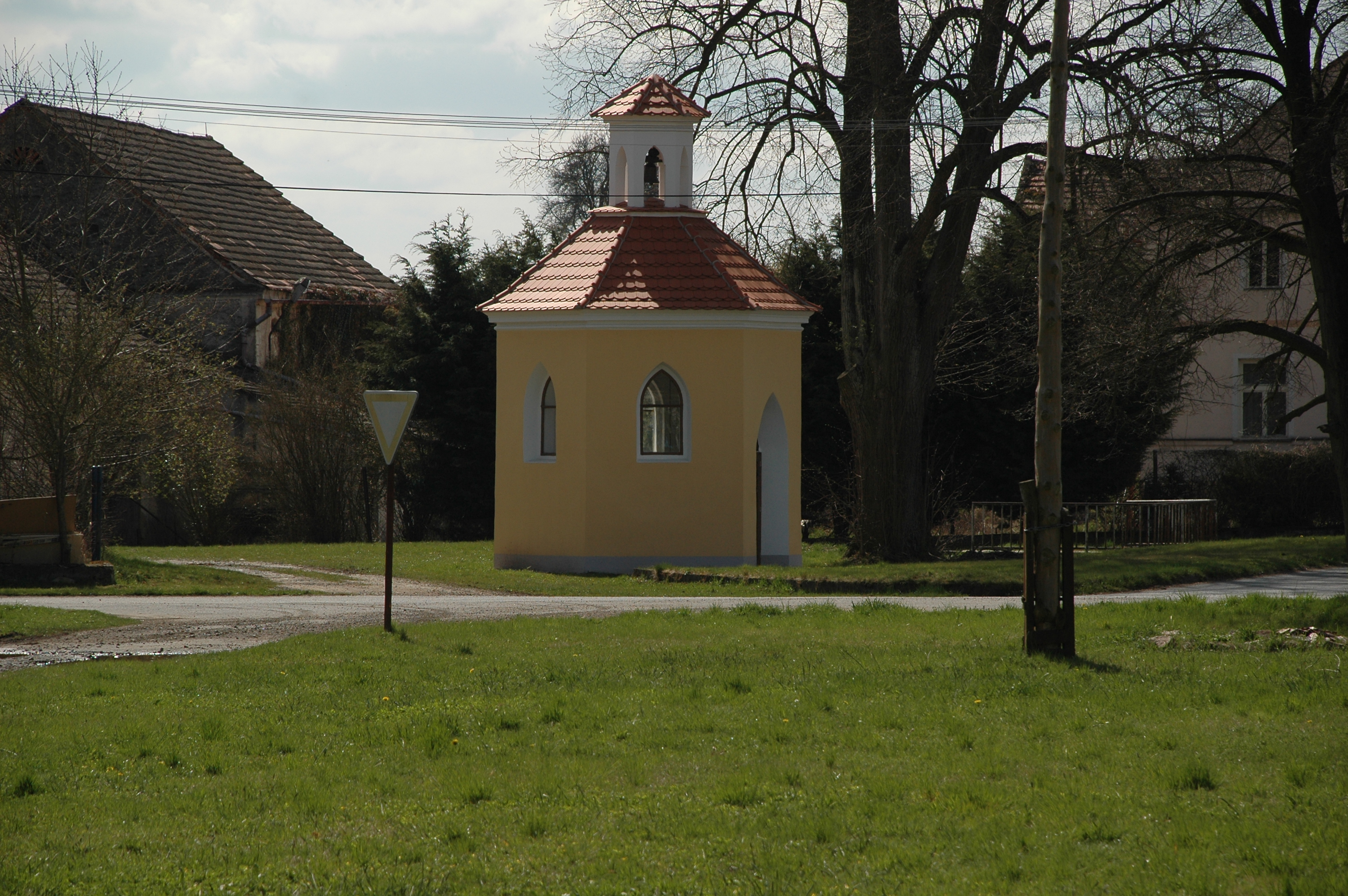
Village chapel on a village square
