= Czech Hiking Markers System =

International trail marker system

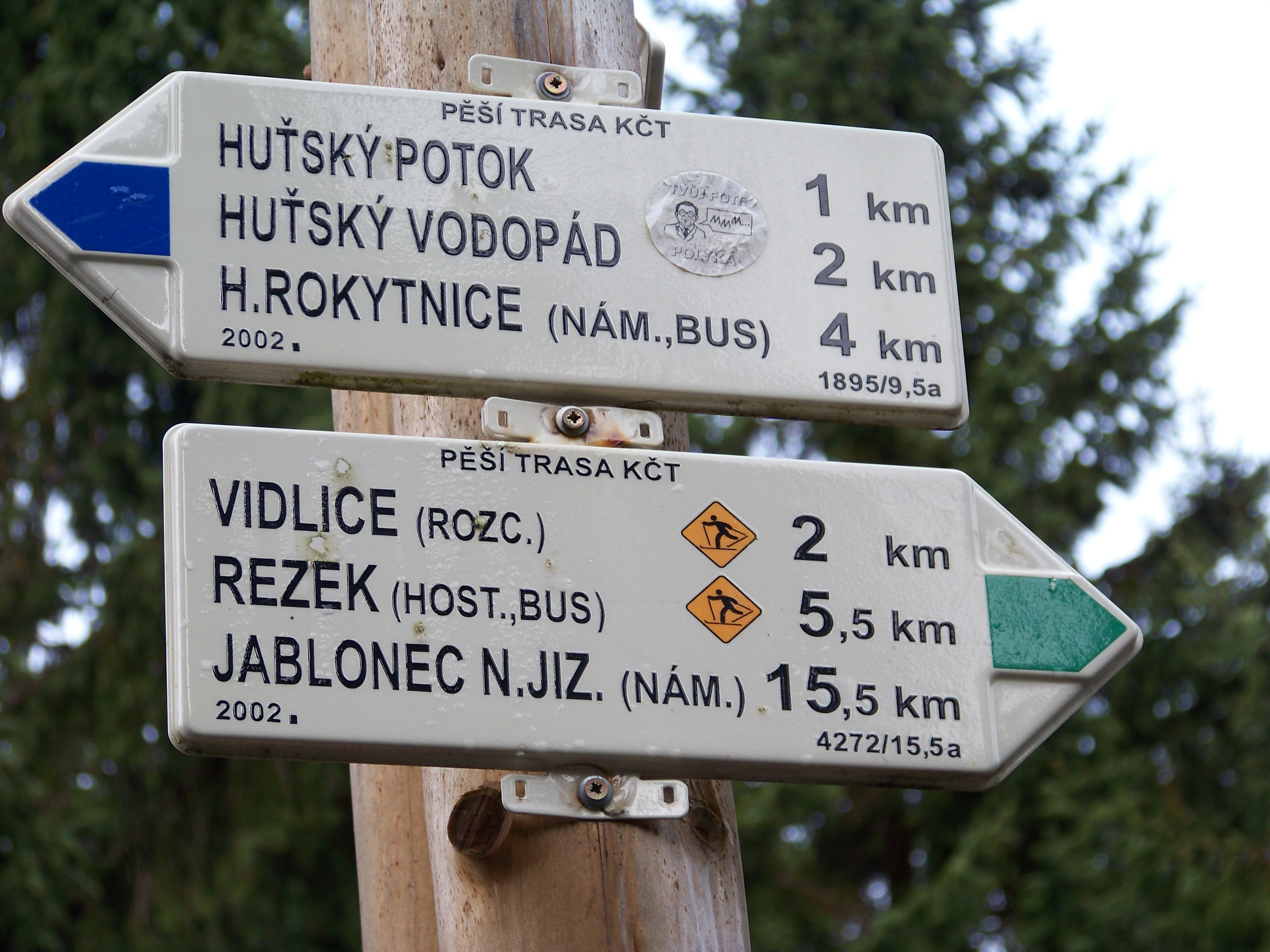
Arrow signs at the start of two trails - blue and green

The Czech Hiking Markers Standard is an international system of hiking markers for tourist trails, used in more countries than any competing standard. The signs and markers can be used in both wilderness and cities. They are internationally well understandable as they grow from the same tradition in other Central European countries. Similar signs are in use in Austria, Germany, Poland and Switzerland.

== Basic hiking markers ==
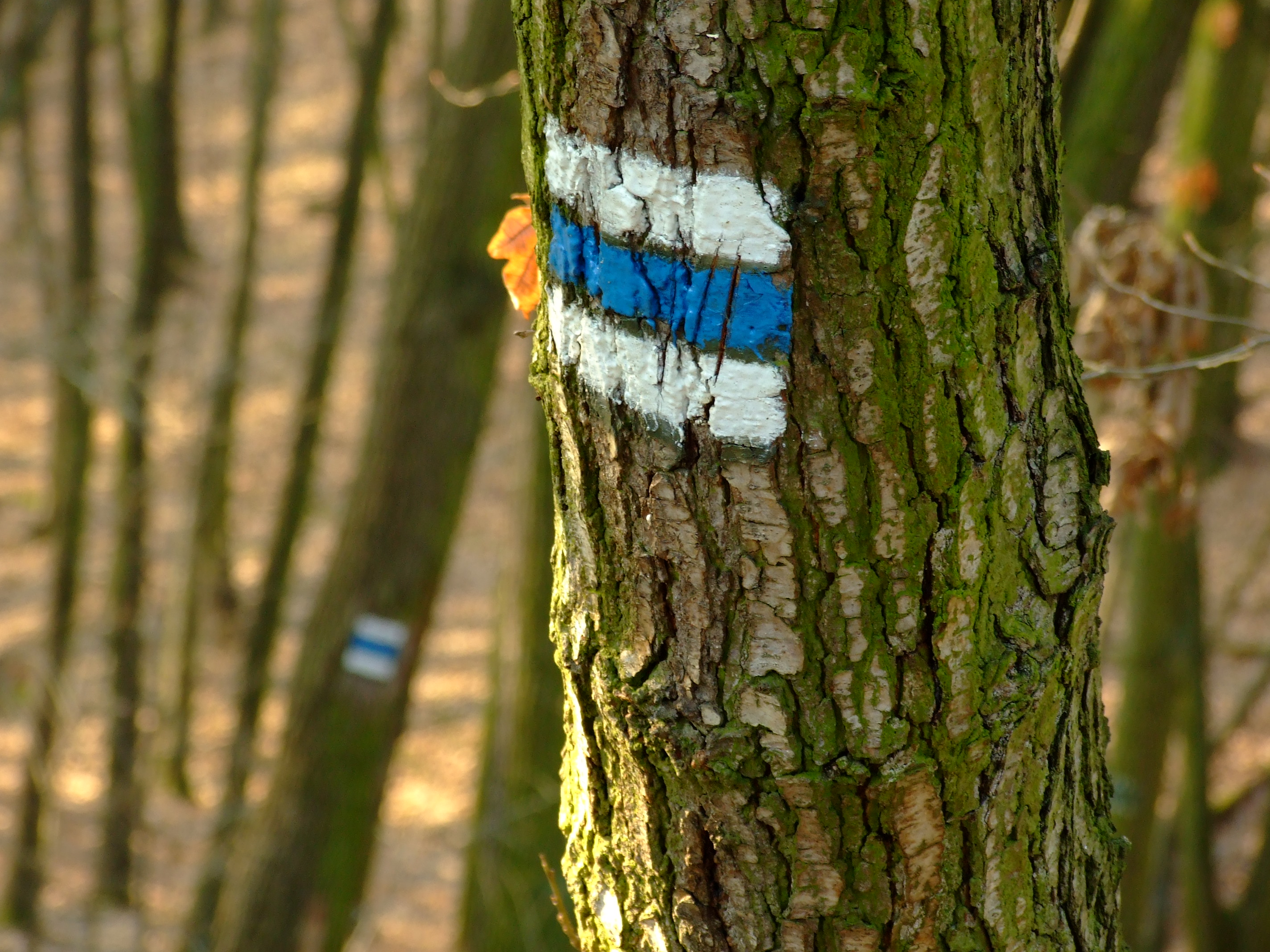
Coloured markers throughout the trail accompany the hiker - this is the blue marked trail

The trail usually starts with arrow signs with names of destinations and number of kilometres marked. Each trail is then colour marked by simple markers and arrows painted between white lines (for better visibility) on fixed objects along the trail (trees, rocks, utility posts or walls) in a colour given to a specific trail. The paint is chosen so that it does not impact the surrounding environment.

Basic implementation of the system requires only a color paint and a brush (plus a cardboard cut matrix for even size of the signs), with which an entire country can be marked.

Nevertheless, many other also very modern features can be added using GPS and mobile phone applications.

== Additional features ==
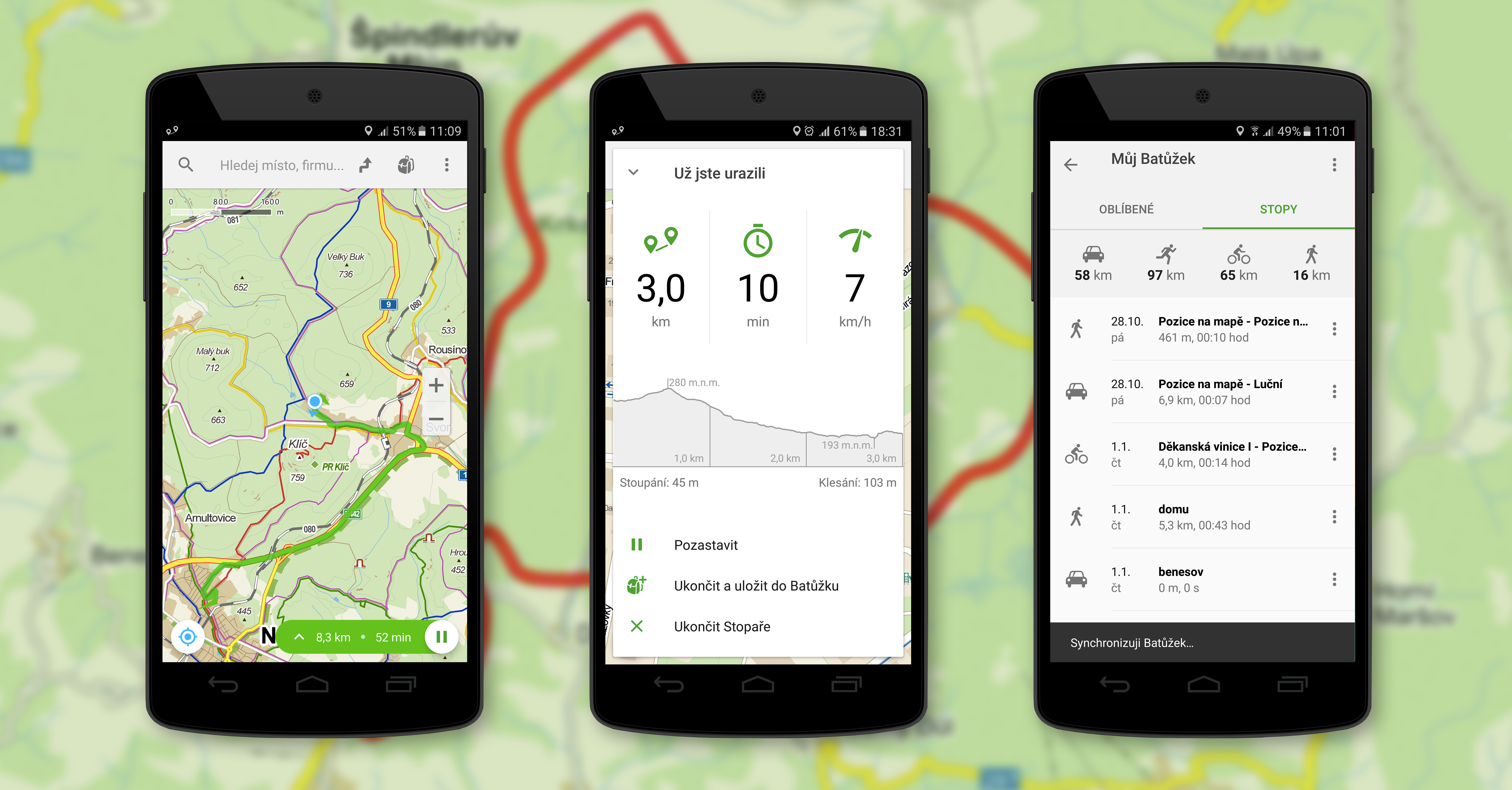
Tourist Map Application showing different trails in colors (red, blue, yellow and green) and related information for the hiker

The basic system of trails with markers painted along the trail can be complemented by other features. These additional features are not necessary for the basic functioning of the system though.

- Information boards along the trail, giving information about the trail and its difficulty, nature protection, monuments, animals and trees along the trail. Logos of the supervising institution can be shown.
- Printed maps with coloured lines showing the trails.
- GPS information on each trail, board or sign
- Mobile phone application with a map and site descriptions (electronic tourist guide) contains additional information about the trail difficulty, slope inclination, gives the opportunity of hike planning and features that would not be possible on the signs etc.

== Usage and extent ==
This method of trail blazing has a wide international usage in most of Central and Eastern Europe (including the Balkans and Caucasus), with showcase examples also in parts of Latin America and Asia.

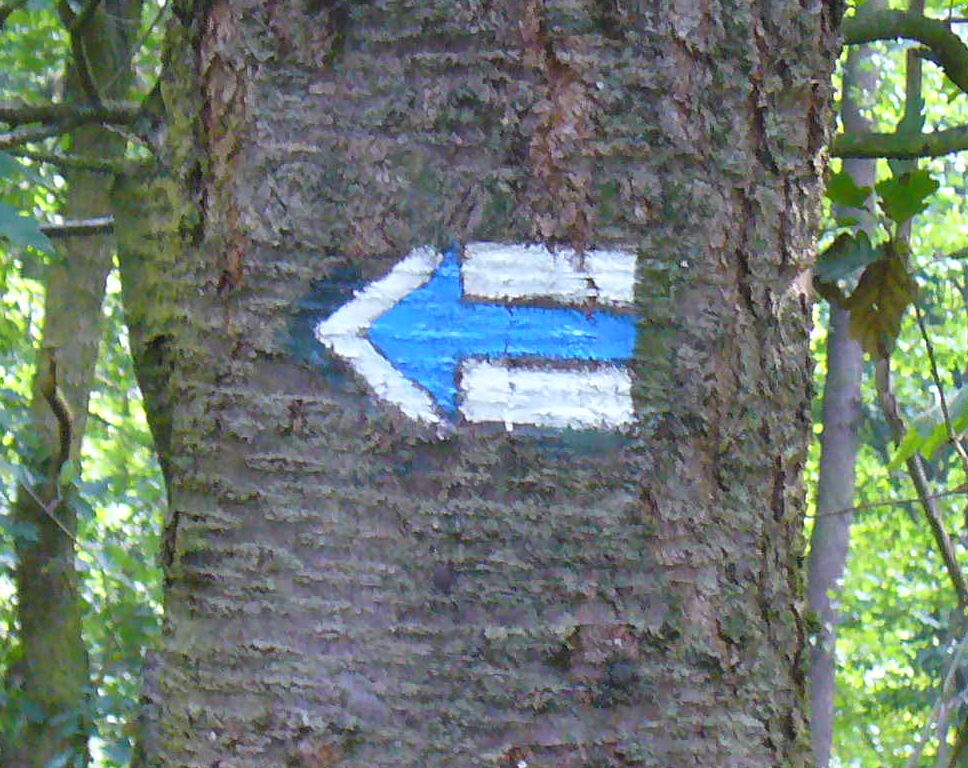
Left Turn Marker on a blue trail - marker showing the change of direction of the trail

The system has been used by the Czech Hiking Club since 1888. The entire territory of the Czech Republic is covered with marked trails, and detailed maps are published and widely available. In the Czech Republic, over 70,000 km of hiking trails have been marked in this way. Of these, 39,816 km of hiking trails were marked in 2008. An additional 31,104 km of cycling trails, 387 km of skiing trails, and 1300 km of horse riding trails are also marked. In 1938 it was the longest system in the world, but now it is the densest network according to Czechs, though Switzerland has about twice as dense trail system (see: Swiss hiking trails – unique but under pressure)

Maps of the trails have also been made into a number of digital applications - both Apple and Android for mobile phones, on Google Maps, and on the Czech "Mapy.com".

== Czech Markers standard ==
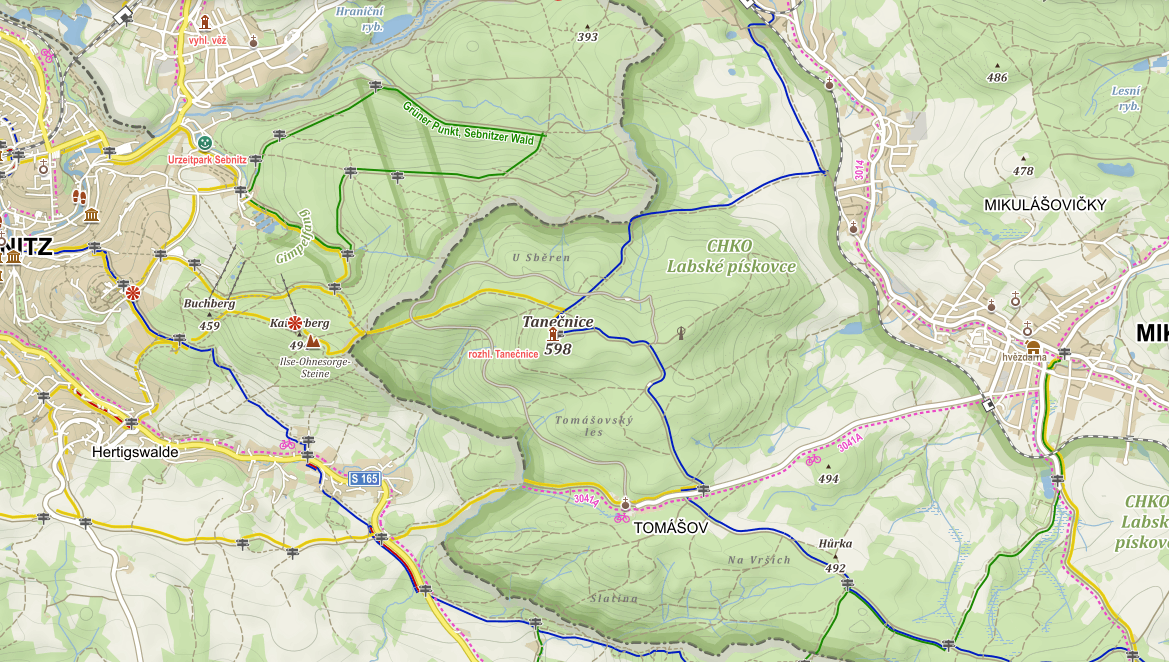
Printed map with green and blue trail marked. The color coded trails in many mobile applications are used by tourists and hikers. They also enable route planning, information about its difficulty etc.

This system uses three bars - usually one colour in between two white bars, with different meanings attached to different colours:

- red indicates the most difficult or summit trails;
- blue for significant trails;
- green for shorter local trails;
- yellow for short interconnecting trails.

These marks may be posted on wooden boards or metallic plates, as well as directly on tree trunks and rocks along the trail.

Basic Marker - Red colour used for difficult or summit trails

Basic trail markers are square, 10x10 cm in size. The volunteers marking these trails usually prepare sheet metal or cardboard stencils to keep the signs uniform in size.

Any change of direction is marked with arrows of the same colour and similar design. There are also symbols for short side-trails (to peak or lookout, ruin, well or spring, or other point of interest) and for the end of the trail.

The system is usually supplemented by maps, which show the trails as lines in corresponding colours. Nevertheless, maps are not necessary for the system to function, as walkers can simply follow the trail from marker to marker.

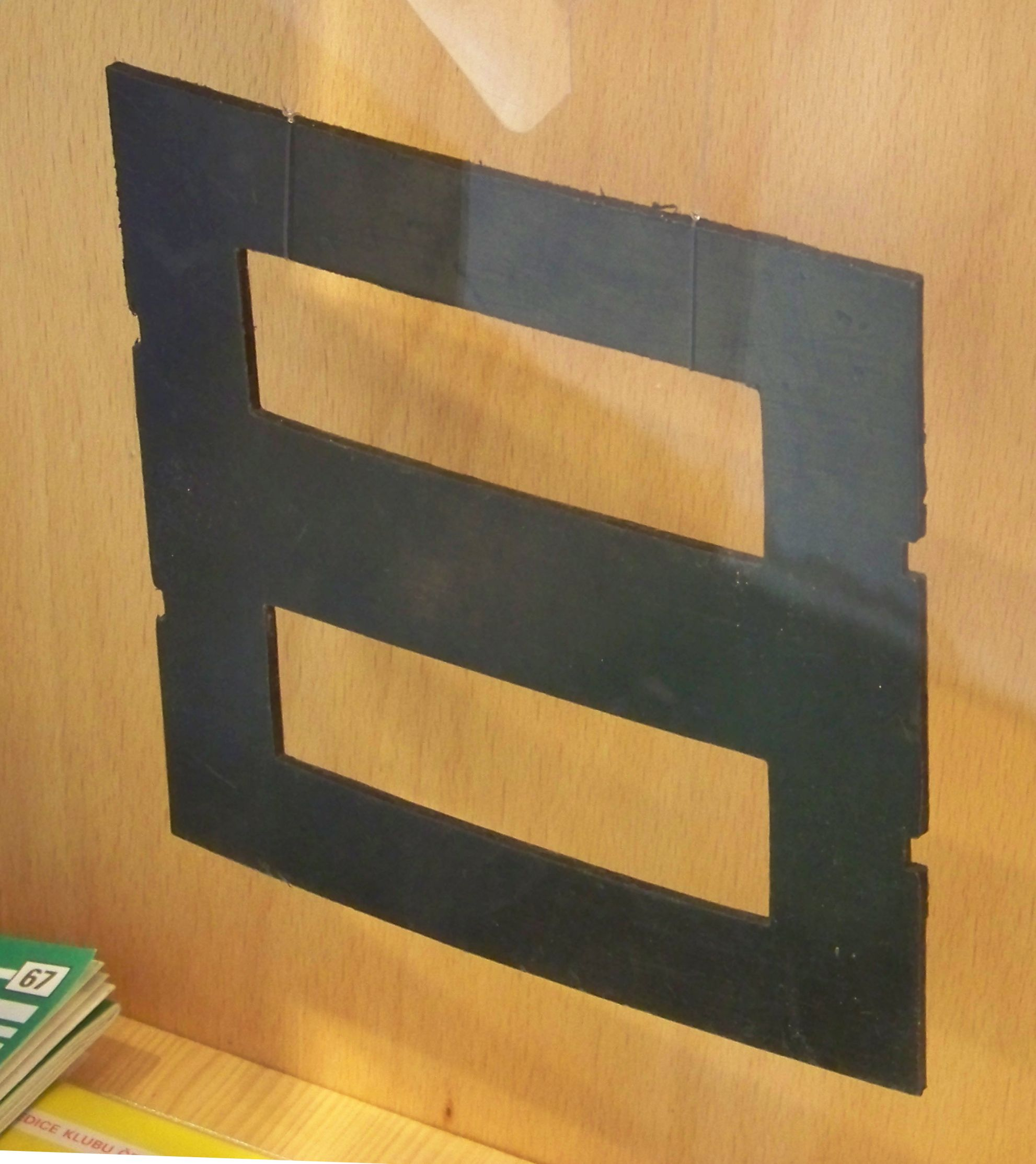
Cardboard stencil for a basic marker of 10x10 cm - used by volunteers painting the markers along the trail

== Czech Markers around the world ==
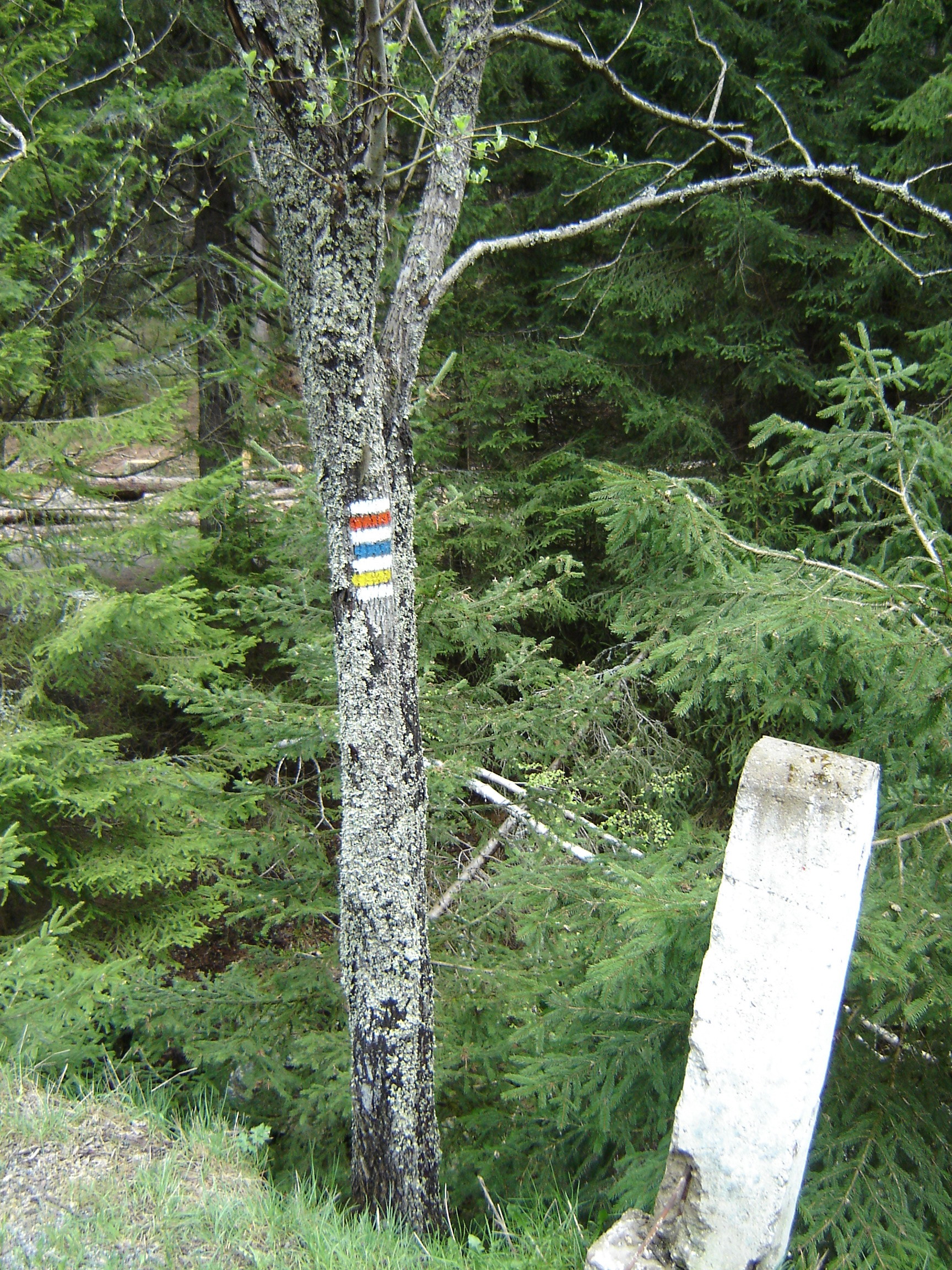
Several trails marked together before they split in different directions

Due to the relative ease of use and low cost, the system has spread to many other countries, often by Czech people. Originally used in the Czech Republic, the system spread through Central Europe and Eastern Europe and even to countries outside Europe. Nearly identical systems exist in the neighbouring countries of Austria and Poland.

- Austria's standard is almost identical, with red-white-red stripes used instead of white-red-white.
- Azerbaijan uses 3 trail markers, blue, red and green, like the colors of the country’s flag.
- Brazil.
- Bosnia - Maglić Mountain
- Bulgaria - The colors are used to differentiate distinct paths and do not indicate the duration, difficulty, or type of the trail. The only exception is the color red, which is typically used to mark international trails (such as the E3, E4 and E8), ridge-line trails, and main routes; however, this is an advisory guideline rather than a strict rule.
- Croatia especially on the island of Krk, with a map available in local tourist centers. The Czech Tourist Club marked a network of historical goat trails that can now be used by tourists hiking in the mountains.
- Czech Republic - fully covered with marked trails and detailed maps and the densest trail network in the world
- Georgia - Caucasus trails marked by Czech volunteers, particularly the mountain border between Georgia, Ingushetia, Chechnya and Dagestan.
- Hungary
- Israel - trail markers are larger (approximately 20x15 cm) but based on the same three stripe scheme. Long trails add a purple (regional) or orange (national) dot on the right white stripe.
- Mongolia A pilot program was launched in July 2023 with some help from experts in Brno
- Peru
- Philippines - Three new trails were marked to showcase the system on Mount Kanlaon Volcano, Negros Island, with the trail marked by Czech volunteers from Mendel University, in cooperation with the Czech Embassy. Additional new and more extensive trails have been marked in 2017;
- Poland - these markers are especially common on trails near the Czech and Slovak borders. The system is a slight expansion of the Czech model, adding black to the four colours used in the Czech markers.
- Romania - 300-400 km of trails marked by the Czech Tourist Club in the Banat region, as well as a 360 km mountain trail leading from Slovakia across Ukraine to Romania.
- Slovakia fully covered with marked trails and detailed maps
- Switzerland uses a modified form with blue marking Alpine trails, which are more difficult than red trails
- Ukraine especially in Subcarpathian Ukraine and Crimea with some 700 km of trails marked in 2011 in Subcarpathia and continuing efforts by Czech, Ukraininan and Polish volunteers to mark additional routes with part of the program sponsored by the Czech Ministry of Foreign Affairs. Maps of the trails are available.
- Vietnam has shown interest in the system, and it is being implemented in three national parks, specifically Cat Tien, Cuc Phuong and Phong Nha-Ke Bang.

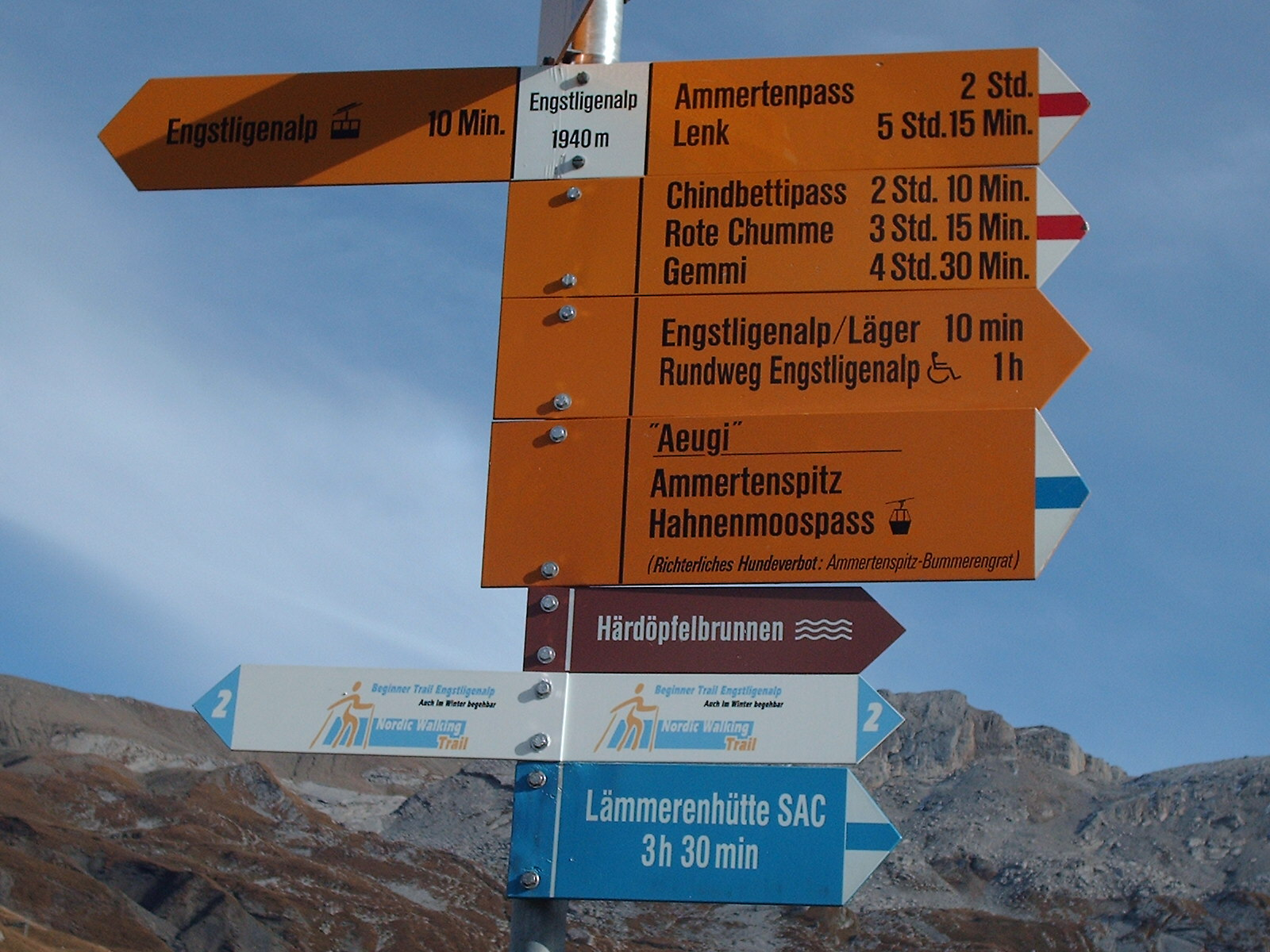
Switzerland - colours denoting difficulty
