= Keprník =

Mountain in the Czech Republic

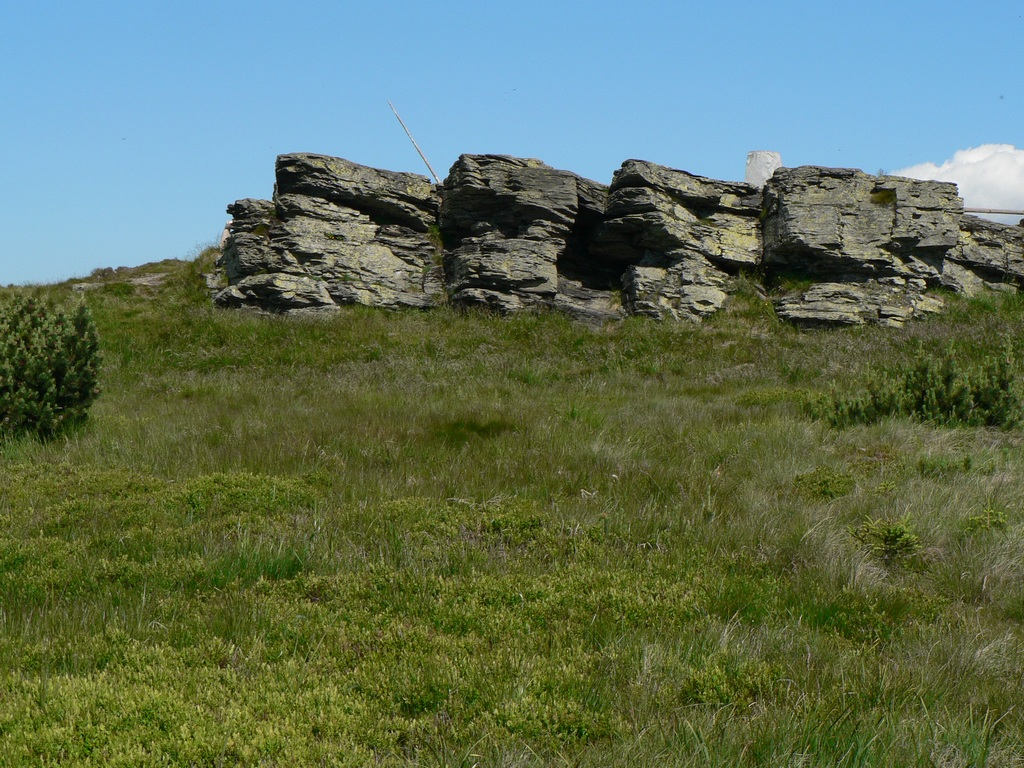
- Summit of Keprník mountain

Highest point
- Elevation: 1,423 m (4,669 ft)
- Prominence: 410 m (1,350 ft)
- Parent peak: Praděd
- Isolation: 12 km (7.5 mi)
- Listing: Mountains of the Czech Republic
- Coordinates: 50°10′15″N 17°6′59″E

Geography
- Location within Czech Republic
- Location: Ostružná, Czech Republic
- Parent range: Hrubý Jeseník

Keprník is a mountain in the Hrubý Jeseník mountain range in the Czech Republic. It has an elevation of 1,423 m (4,669 ft) above sea level. It is located in the municipality of Ostružná, on the historical border between Silesia and Moravia.

== Characteristics ==
=== Location ===
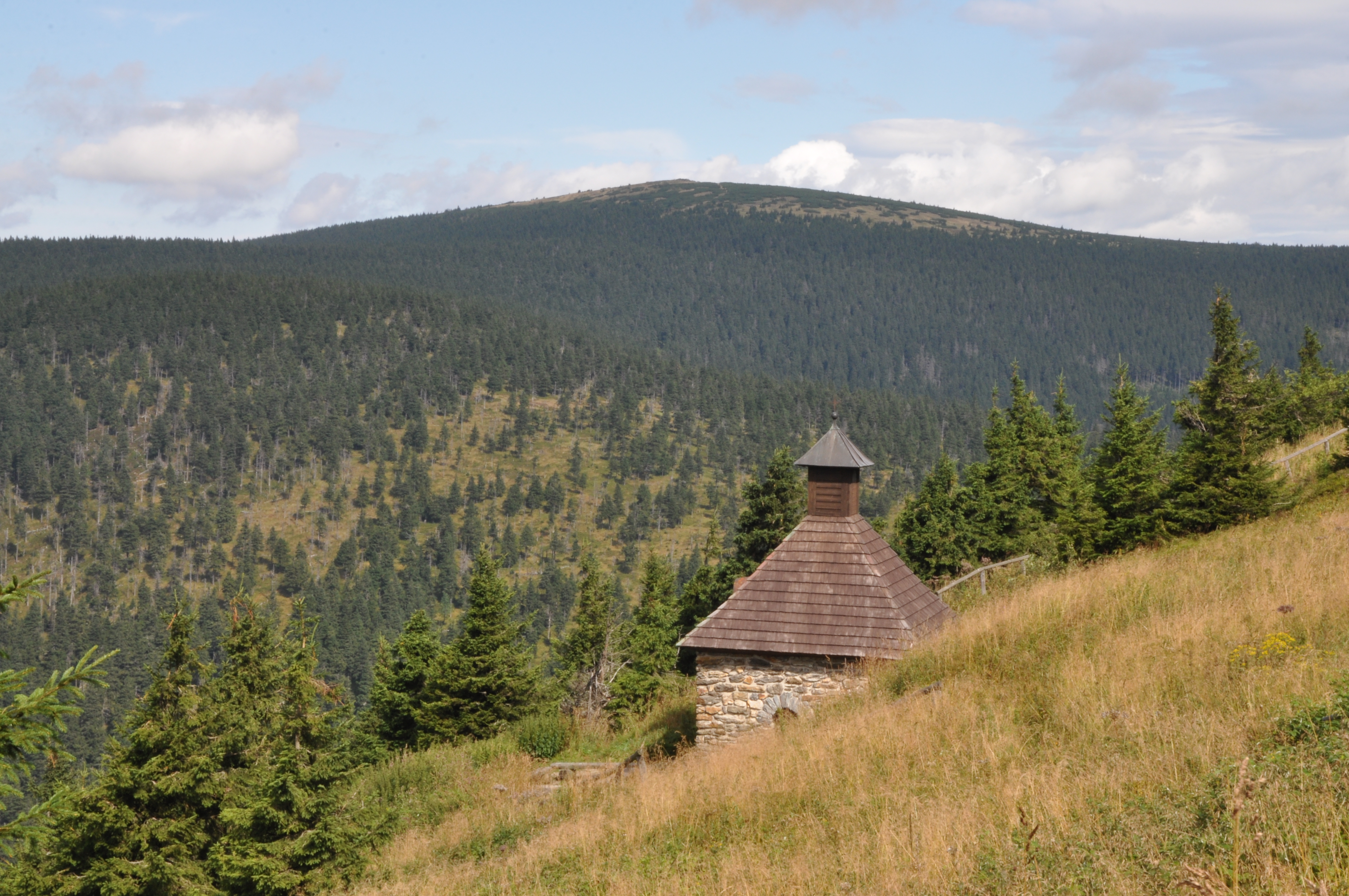
View from the area near the Vřesová studánka spring towards Keprník mountain

Keprník is located in the northwestern region of the entire Hrubý Jeseník range, lying almost centrally in the Hrubý Jeseník area, in a sub-region called the Keprník Massif (Czech: Keprnická hornatina). It sits on the main ridge that runs from Červenohorské sedlo pass to Ramzovské sedlo pass. The peak is easily recognizable due to its characteristic summit rock formation, situated on a deforested summit area among high-altitude vegetation. It appears to be the highest peak in this part of the Hrubý Jeseník range at first glance and is the main central peak of the Keprník Massif. It is very visible and recognizable from the road surrounding the summit area of Praděd mountain (visible to the right of the Vozka peak). Another notable viewpoint is from the road around the Dlouhé stráně peak, from where it is also very visible and recognizable, located to the right of the Vozka peak. Keprník is the fifth-highest peak in the Hrubý Jeseník range (following the peaks: Praděd, Vysoká hole, Vysoká hole–JZ, and Petrovy kameny). The mountain is bounded by:

- to the north, the Sedlo pod Keprníkem pass towards the Šerák mountain;
- to the northeast, the valleys of the Keprnický potok and Bystrý potok streams;
- to the east, a minor pass (the highest in the Keprník Massif) at an elevation of 1,344 m above sea level towards the Žalostná peak
- to the southeast, the valley of the Rudohorský potok stream and the Sedlo pod Vřesovkou pass towards the Červená hora–S peak;
- to the south, the valley of the Hučivá Desná stream;
- to the southwest, the Sedlo Trojmezí pass towards the Vozka peak and the valley of the Jelení potok stream;
- to the northwest, the valley of the Klepáčský potok stream.

Surrounding peaks include:

- to the northeast, Šumný, Spálená stráň, Nad Výrovkou, and Domašovský kopec (located in the Opawskie Mountains range (Czech: Zlatohorská vrchovina));
- to the east, Žalostná;
- to the southeast, Bršť (also in the Opawskie Mountains range), Točník, Červená hora–S, Červená hora, and Šindelná hora;
- to the south, Spálený vrch–SV;
- to the southwest, Vozka, Polom, and Jelení stráň;
- to the west, Černava–JZ;
- to the northwest, Černava, Mračná hora, Šerák–JZ, and Šerák.

=== Slopes ===
Within Keprník, 7 main slopes can be distinguished:

- northern;
- northeastern, known as V Žalostné;
- eastern, known as Vlčinec;
- southern;
- southwestern, known as Trojmezí
- western, known as Jelení stráň

The slopes, roughly from an elevation of 1,260 to 1,390 m above sea level and downward, are predominantly forested with spruce. Above this range, in accordance with the altitudinal zonation, alpine tundra dominates, covered with grass and planted dwarf mountain pine. The slopes feature all types of forests: spruce forest, mixed forest, (Note: The forest stand of the entire Jeseníky Protected Landscape Area includes: European spruce 84%, European beech 10%, European larch 1.5%, sycamore maple 1.1%, birch 1%, common alder 0.8%, dwarf mountain pine 0.4%, grey alder 0.3%, (European silver fir, European ash, and linden) 0.2%, Scotch pine 0.1%, and others (Pinus mugo, oak, hornbeam, Norway maple, elm, rowan, green alder, aspen, poplar, and goat willow) 0.2%.) and deciduous forest. On the northeastern, eastern, and western slopes, besides the spruce forests, there are small areas of mixed forest as the elevation decreases, and even small patches of deciduous forest on the eastern slope. Almost all slopes are characterized by significant variability in forest cover, with substantial clearings and thinning, and even bare areas. On the northern slope, close to the summit area, there is a single larger rock formation, while on the northeastern, eastern, and western slopes there are numerous groups of rocks. Approximately 1.6 km southwest of the summit (on the western slope), at an elevation of around 1,060 m above sea level, near the flowing stream named Jelení potok, there is a rock group called Jelení stráň. Additionally, on the western slope near the Sedlo pod Keprníkem pass, there is an area covered with rock debris.

The slopes have relatively uneven and varied gradients. The average slope inclination ranges from 6° (eastern slope) to 17° (southeastern slope). The average inclination of all the mountain's slopes (weighted average of the slopes' gradients) is about 12°. The maximum average inclination of the eastern slope, at elevations around 1,150 m above sea level, does not exceed 40° over a 50-meter section. The slopes are covered with a network of roads and generally unmarked paths and tracks.

Approximately 995 m north of the summit, close to the red tourist trail (about 30 m away), at an elevation of 1,309 m above sea level, there is a monument with a stone commemorative plaque, erected on 26 September 1935. It features the image of the Silesian writer and mountain enthusiast Hermann Löns, along with the following inscription:

Hermann Löns
zum Gedenken
1866 – 1914

=== Main summit ===
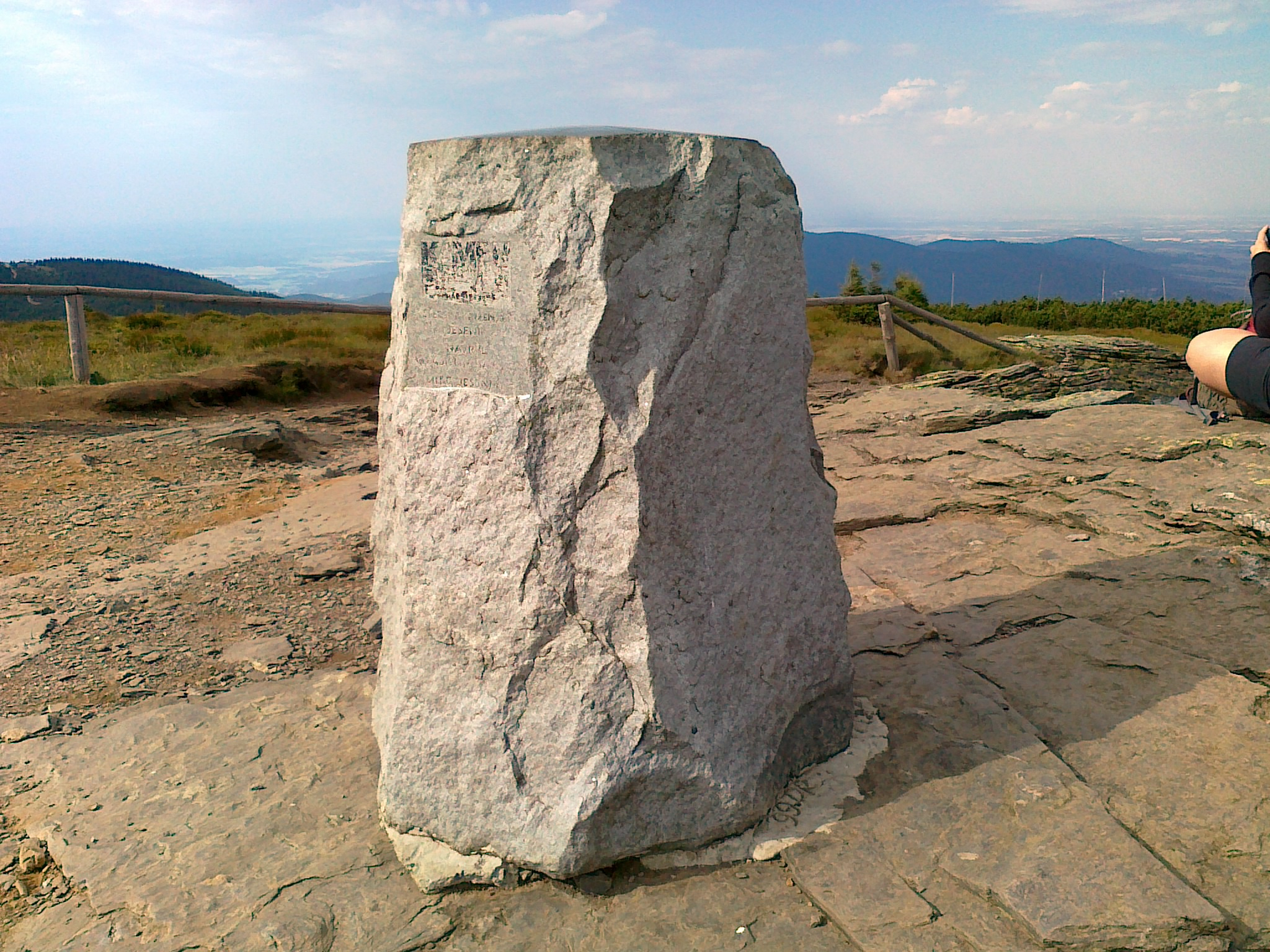
Monument Kámen at the summit of Keprník

There are no marked tourist trails leading directly to the main summit. The main ridge path crosses the summit area, along with a red tourist trail and a green educational path, which leads to the secondary peak Keprník–JV. Near this path is a tourist intersection named Keprník (vrchol) with an informational sign indicating an elevation of 1,423 m.

The summit of the mountain is on an exposed rocky outcrop about 20 m in length, which serves as a scenic viewpoint. From there, expansive views can be seen, including the peaks of Černava, Šerák, Šumný, Červená hora, and Troják, as well as distant mountain ranges such as the Giant Mountains with Sněžka, the Králický Sněžník Mountains, the Beskids, the Malá Fatra, and even the Slovak Tatras. Additionally, a small conical monument called Kámen with a worn commemorative inscription is located on this rocky outcrop:

KÁMEN
SLEZSKÝ KÁMEN, a.s.
JESENÍK
NAVRHL
Mgr.LADISLAV HAJNÝ
CHKO JESENÍKY

On top of this monument, lines with the names of visible peaks are marked. The summit area also features a triangulation station, marked on geodetic maps as number 22, with an elevation of 1,422.80 m above sea level and geographical coordinates 50°10′15.42″N 17°06′59.08″E, located about 10 m north of the summit. The State Geodetic and Cadastral Office lists the highest point of the mountain – the summit – at an elevation of 1,423.3 m above sea level and geographical coordinates 50°10′15.1″N 17°06′59.2″E.

Access to the summit is via the main path and the Keprník (vrchol) tourist intersection, from which a path about 30 m long with wooden railings on either side leads to the summit.

=== Secondary summits ===
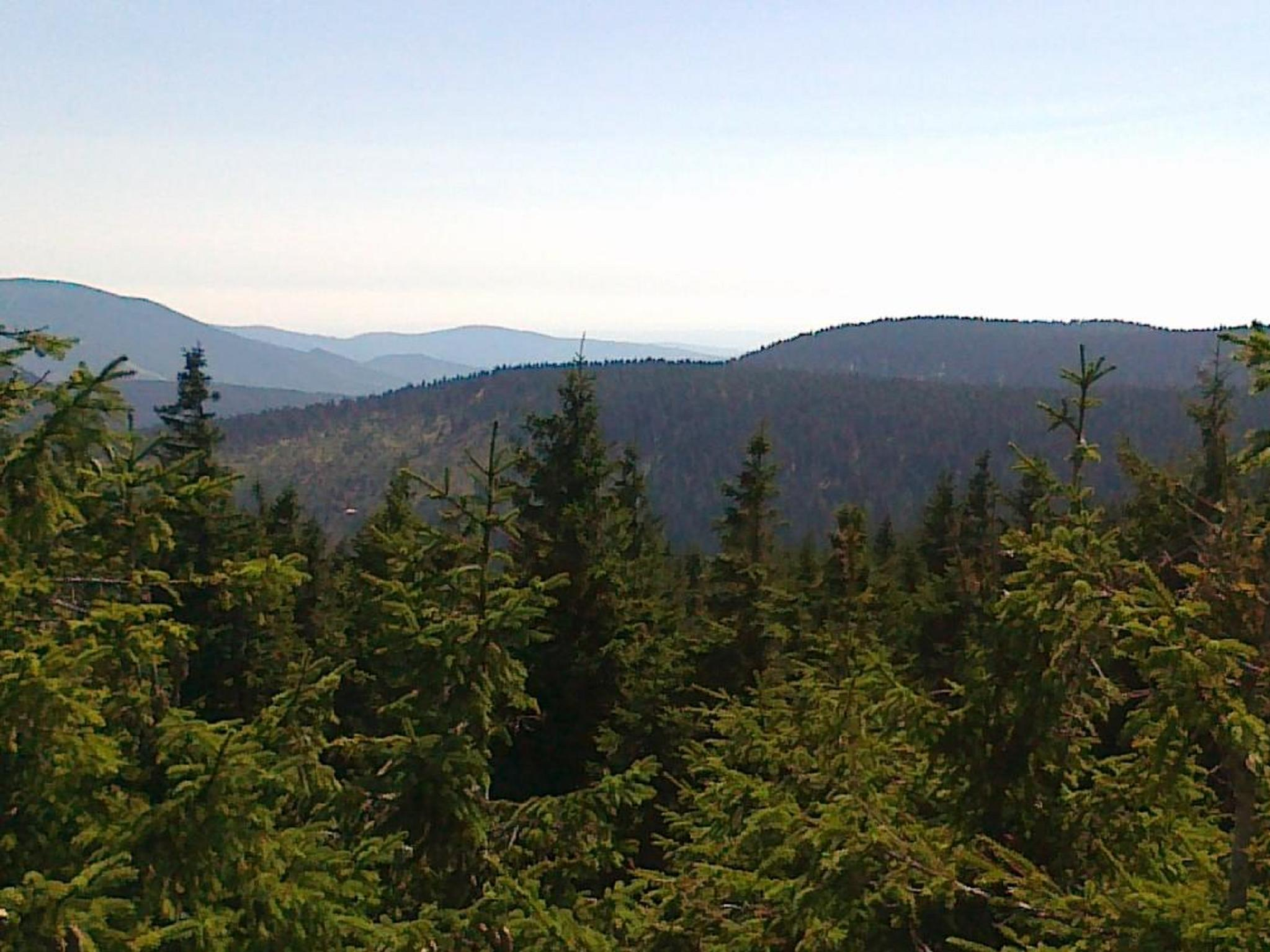
View from the summit rock group of Žalostná mountain towards the secondary summit Keprník–JV, with Spálený vrch–SV and Spálený vrch to the right

Keprník is a mountain with three summits. Apart from the main summit, the mountain massif includes two lower secondary summits.

Secondary summits of Keprník
Number	Summit	Elevation (meters above sea level)	Distance from main summit (meters)	Geographic coordinates
1	Keprník–J	1,322	840 to the south	50°09′48.0″N 17°06′54.5″E
2	Keprník–JV	1,286	1,670 to the southeast	50°09′23.4″N 17°07′22.5″E

=== Geology ===
Geologically, the Keprník massif belongs to the unit known as the Keprník Dome and is composed of metamorphic rocks, mainly gneisses (biotite), orthogneisses, erlan, mylonites, blasto-mylonites, migmatites, schists, and igneous rocks, primarily meta-granites. The geological structure also contains admixtures of gemstones such as staurolite, andalusite, garnet, and sillimanite. The summit features cryoplanation terraces and frost cliffs formed during the Pleistocene in a periglacial climate. It is likely that a small mountain glacier existed on the southeastern slope during this period, leaving behind the so-called Keprnický kar.

=== Waters ===
Keprník lies on the European watershed boundary, with its northeastern, eastern, and southeastern slopes draining into the Baltic Sea basin (Oder river basin), and its southwestern and western slopes draining into the Black Sea basin (Danube river basin). Several streams originate from its slopes: Jelení potok from the southwestern slope, Klepáčský potok from the western slope, Keprnický potok from the northeastern slope, and Rudohorský potok from the southeastern slope. Small swampy areas can be found on the southwestern and southern slopes at elevations around 1,320 and 1,300 m above sea level.

=== Waterfalls ===
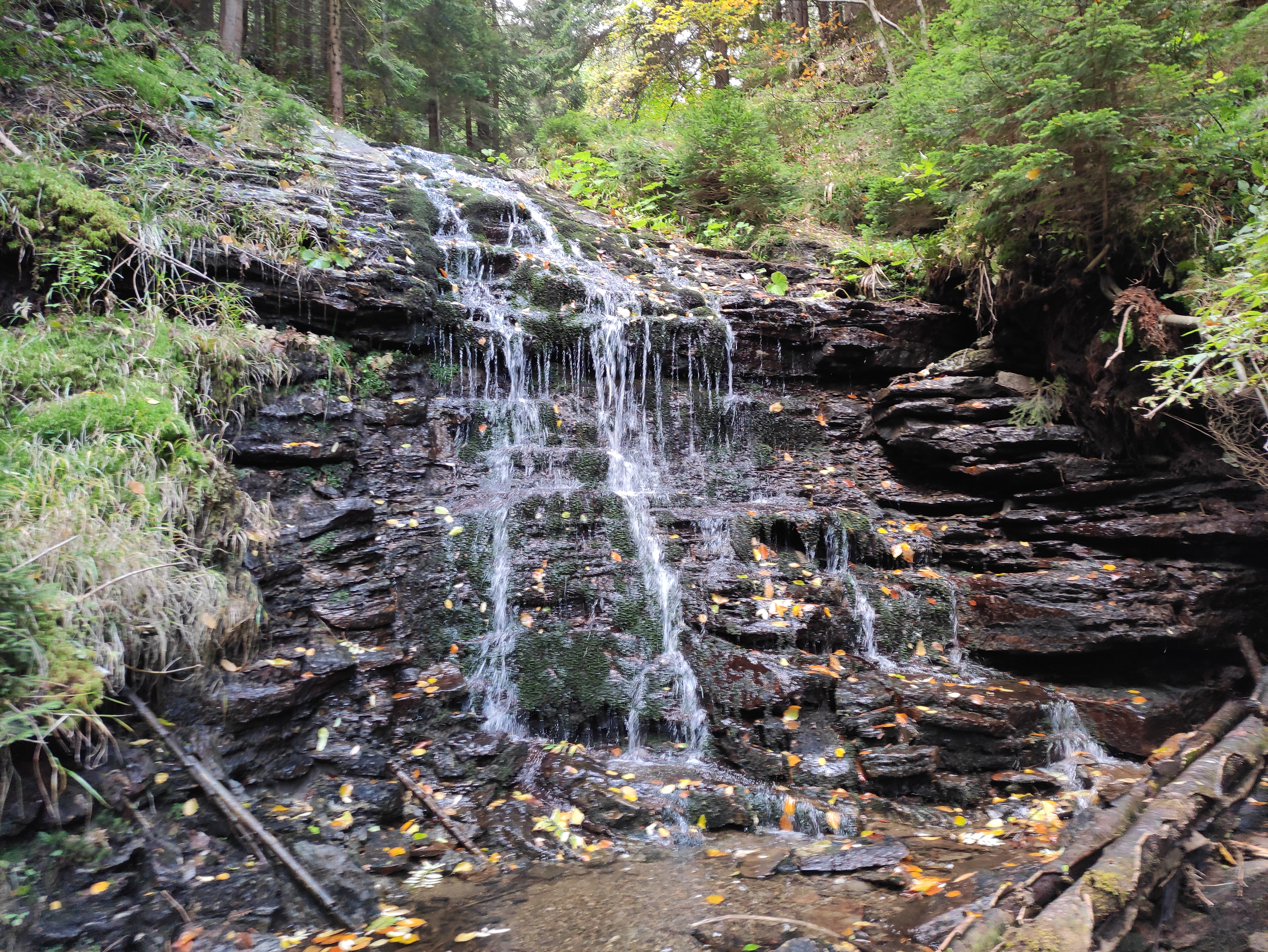
Vodopády Bystrého potoka

For landscape enthusiasts, the waterfalls scattered across the slopes of the mountain on nearly all streams are a major attraction. Reaching them is challenging and requires the use of detailed maps.

Waterfalls on the slopes of Keprník
Number	Waterfall	Stream	Location	Elevation (meters above sea level)	Waterfall height (meters)
1	Jelení vodopády	Jelení potok	Western slope, about 1.3 km west of the summit	1,015–1,110	4,5; 9; 4+2; 3; 2.5; 4.5
2	Keprnické vodopády	Keprnický potok	Northeastern slope, about 960 m northeast of the summit	1,115	8
3	Rudohorské vodopády	Rudohorský potok	About 1.2 km southeast of the summit	850–1,075	3; 3; 5; 4; 2; 7,2; 4; 2.5; 6; 8.5; 2
4	Vodopády Bystrého potoka	Bystrý potok	About 1.4 km northeast of the summit	1,000–1,020	6.5; 5
5	Vodopády pod Morickou	Unnamed tributary of Klepáčský potok	Western slope, about 1.4 km northwest of the summit	1,015–1,120	5; 3; 3.5
6	Vodopád Ve Stržích	Unnamed tributary of Klepáčský potok	About 1.2 km northwest of the summit	1,115–1,160	4; 3; 3.5

== Climate ==
Climate of Keprník

Climate chart (precipitation, max. and min. temperature)
J	F	M	A	M	J	J	A	S	O	N	D
38 −6 −11	35 −5 −10	51 0 −7	58 6 −3	100 11 2	101 14 5	115 16 7	91 17 7	66 12 3	38 7 −1	46 0 −6	38 −4 −9
- █ Average max. and min. temperatures in °C
- █ Precipitation totals in mm
- Source: Klimat Keprník. meteoblue.com
Imperial conversion
J	F	M	A	M	J	J	A	S	O	N	D
1.5 21 12	1.4 23 14	2 32 19	2.3 43 27	3.9 52 36	4 57 41	4.5 61 45	3.6 63 45	2.6 54 37	1.5 45 30	1.8 32 21	1.5 25 16
- █ Average max. and min. temperatures in °F
- █ Precipitation totals in inches

At the summit, harsh climatic conditions prevail (the average annual temperature is about 2.2°C, the average annual precipitation is about 1,200 mm, and the snow cover on the mountain remains for about 180 days a year).

== Nature protection ==
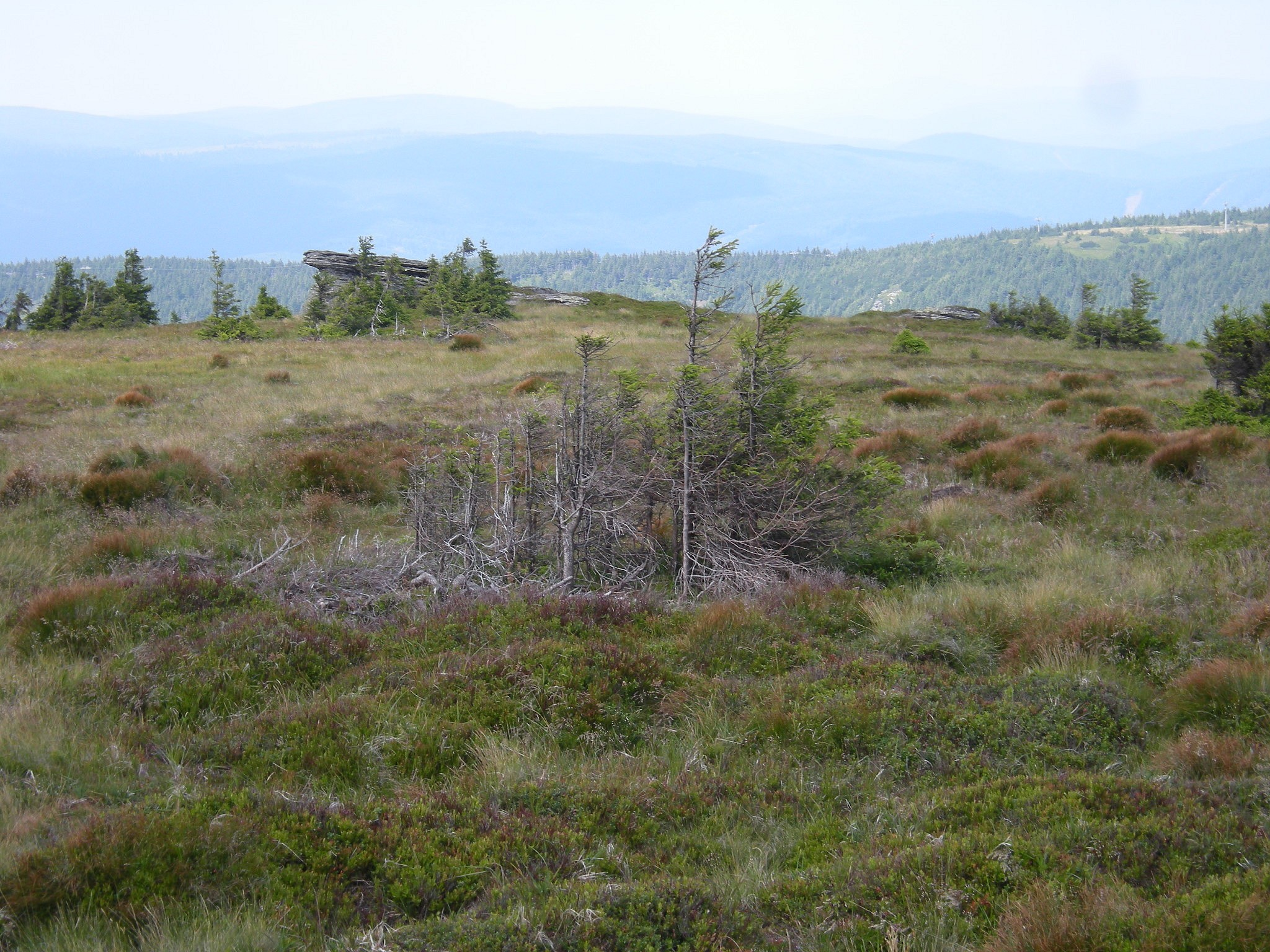
Vegetation at the summit of Keprník

The summit area and parts of all slopes are within the Šerák-Keprník National Nature Reserve (Czech: Národní přírodní rezervace Šerák-Keprník), which is part of the designated protected area known as the Jeseníky Protected Landscape Area (Czech: Chráněná krajinná oblast (CHKO) Jeseníky). This reserve was established to protect rock, soil, and plant formations as well as rare animal species. No nature monuments have been established on the slopes.

Along the red tourist trail, an educational path named With Koprníček on an excursion to the Keprník Mountains (Czech: NS S Koprníčkem na výlet Keprnickými horami) has been created, with 13 observation points, running from Červenohorské sedlo to Ramzová.

=== Šerák-Keprník National Nature Reserve ===
The Šerák-Keprník National Nature Reserve is located at elevations ranging from 1,300 to 1,423 m above sea level, covering an area of 794.30 ha (1,962.8 acres) (with a protective buffer zone of up to 1,169.83 ha). Established on 31 December 1933, the reserve protects a series of preserved rock and soil formations formed during the harsh climate of the Ice age, such as cryoplanation terraces, frost ribs, and hummockss, along with the flora and fauna found within these areas. The reserve is open to tourists, with both hiking and cycling trails as well as an educational path running through it.

== Tourism ==
=== Tourist trails ===
The Czech Tourist Club has marked four tourist trails:

Červenohorské sedlo – Červená hora – Vřesová studánka spring – Sedlo pod Vřesovkou pass – Keprník-JV – Trojmezí – Keprník summit – Sedlo pod Keprníkem pass – Šerák mountain – Mračná hora – Černava mountain – Ramzová

Branná – Tři kameny – Troják mountain – Volská louka pass – Vozka mountain – Trojmezí

Branná – Pekelec mountain – Pekelec-SV summit – Alojzovské louky pass – Troják-JZ mountain – Hučava stream valley – Troják mountain – Vozka summit – Sedlo pod Vřesovkou pass

Lipová-lázně – Sněhulák mountain – Strmý mountain – Obří skály – Šerák Mountain – Sedlo pod Keprníkem pass – Šumný mountain – Točník mountain – Filipovice

=== Cycling and skiing trails ===
A small section at the foot of the northeastern slope features the only designated cycling trail:

Spojená cesta – Ztracený vrch mountain – Zaječí hora mountain – Šumná-JV – Šumná mountain – Nad Borovým mountain – Borový potok valley – Bělá pod Pradědem – Žalostná mountain – Šumný mountain – Sedlo pod Keprníkem pass – Šerák mountain – Mračná hora – Černava mountain – Ostružná – Petříkov

During snowy periods, cross-country ski trails are marked along the hiking and cycling trails (except the green tourist trail), including a trail named Jesenická magistrála. No downhill skiing trails are marked within the mountain area.
