= Šerák =

Mountain in the Czech Republic

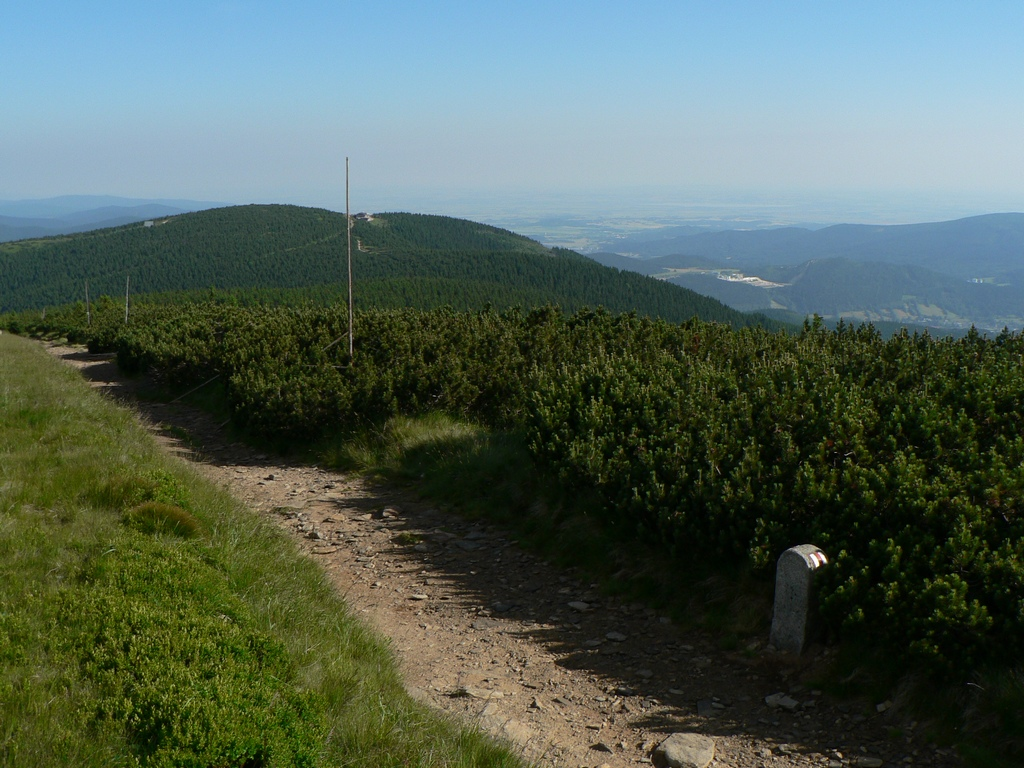
- Šerák mountain visible from Keprník mountain

Highest point
- Elevation: 1,351 m (4,432 ft)
- Prominence: 70
- Coordinates: 50°11′12″N 17°6′24″E

Geography
- Location within Czech Republic
- Location: Ostružná
- Country: Czech Republic
- Parent range: Hrubý Jeseník

Šerák (German: Hochschar) is a mountain in the Hrubý Jeseník mountain range in the Czech Republic. It has an elevation of 1,351 m (4,432 ft) above sea level. It is located in the municipality of Ostružná, on the historic border of Moravia and Silesia.

== Characteristics ==
=== Location ===
Šerák mountain is located in the northwestern region of the Hrubý Jeseník chain, lying in the northwestern area of the Keprník Mountains, situated on its main ridge, stretching from the Červenohorské sedlo pass to the Ramzovské sedlo pass. It is a well-recognized peak, for of all the higher peaks of this massif it is the most northerly, and is situated in the middle, between the highest peak, Keprník, and the characteristic rock formation Obří skály, visible in the form of a "tooth" protruding from the slope. It is invisible from the road surrounding the Praděd mountain peak (obscured by the Keprník mountain massif), and from another distinctive vantage point – from the road surrounding the Dlouhé stráně mountain peak, it is also invisible, because it is obscured by the Keprník mountain massif. It is the fourth-highest (after the peaks of Keprník, Vozka and Žalostná) peak of the microregion called the Keprník massif.

The mountain is surrounded by: from the southeast by the valley of the Keprnický potok and the Sedlo pod Keprníkem pass towards Keprník peak, from the southwest by a not very prominent pass at 1,260 m (4,130 ft) above sea level towards the Mračná hora peak, from the northwest the valley of the Vražedný potok, flowing in the Mordová rokle gorge, from the north the pass with an elevation of 1,085 m (3,560 ft) toward the Obří skály peak and the valley of an unnamed stream flowing in the Medvědí kluzy gully, from the northeast by the pass with an elevation of 885 m (2,904 ft) above sea level towards the Strmý summit and the valley of the Javořický potok, and from the east a pass at 1,062 meters above sea level toward the Šumný summit. Surrounding the mountain are the following peaks: from the east Šumný and Spálená stráň, from the southeast Žalostná and Keprník, from the south Vozka, from the southwest Troják, Troják-SZ, Mračná hora, from the northwest Ovčí vrch (2), (Note: The indexed designation is in contrast to another peak in the same mountain chain with the same name, Ovčí vrch (1), located about 1.5 km east of Karlova Studánka.) Klín, Klínec, Vápenný kopec (the last three peaks lie in the Golden Mountains range (Czech: Rychlebské hory)) and Obří skály, and from the northeast Sněhulák, Strmý, Javořík and Nad hájenkou.

=== Slopes ===
The following seven major slopes can be distinguished within the mountain:

- southeastern
- southern named Ve střích
- southwestern
- northwestern
- northern, named Hřebenná
- northeastern named U brány
- eastern named Solisko, Žalostná, Vyhlídka

All forestation types are present: spruce forest, mixed coniferous forest (Note: The forest stand of the entire Jesioniki Protected Landscape Area includes: Norway spruce 84%, European beech 10%, European larch 1.5%, sycamore 1.1%, birch 1%, black alder 0.8%, dwarf mountain pine 0.4%, grey alder 0.3% (silver fir, ash and linden) 0.2%, Scotch pine 0, 1%, others (mountain pine, oak, hornbeam, Norway maple, elm, rowan, green alder, aspen, poplar and goat willow) 0.2% (Analýza vlivu lesního hospodaření na lesní ekosystémy v CHKO Jeseníky. (PDF)) and deciduous forest, with dense spruce forestation dominating. On all slopes except spruce forest and patches of dwarf mountain pine (except the northern and northeastern slopes), there are areas of mixed coniferous forest and patches of deciduous forest on the northwestern, northeastern and eastern slopes as the altitude decreases, and even meadows on the northern slope, close to the summit slope. Almost all slopes are characterized by significant variation in forestation, with glades and thinnings and even bare woods occurring. On the southwestern slope, there is a larger clearing towards the summit of Mračná hora for a piste and accompanying chairlift. On the northern and eastern slopes there are numerous single larger rock formations, while on the southern, northwestern and northern slopes there are significant rock formations, and on the southern and eastern slopes there are significant areas covered with rock debris. In addition, on the northeastern slope, at a distance of about 200 m (660 ft) northeast of the summit, a field with a ramp for gliding and paragliding named PG startoviště Šerák has been created near Jiřího na Šeráku mountain hut.

The slopes are relatively non-uniform and vary greatly. The average slope varies from 5° (southeastern slope) to 20° (southern and northwestern slopes). The average slope of all the mountain's slopes (weighted arithmetic mean of slopes) is about 13°. The maximum average slope of the southern slope, at an elevation of about 1,175 m (3,855 ft) above sea level, at a distance of 50 m (160 ft) does not exceed 45°. The slopes are covered by a network of roads and generally unmarked paths and ducts.

=== Jiřího hut ===
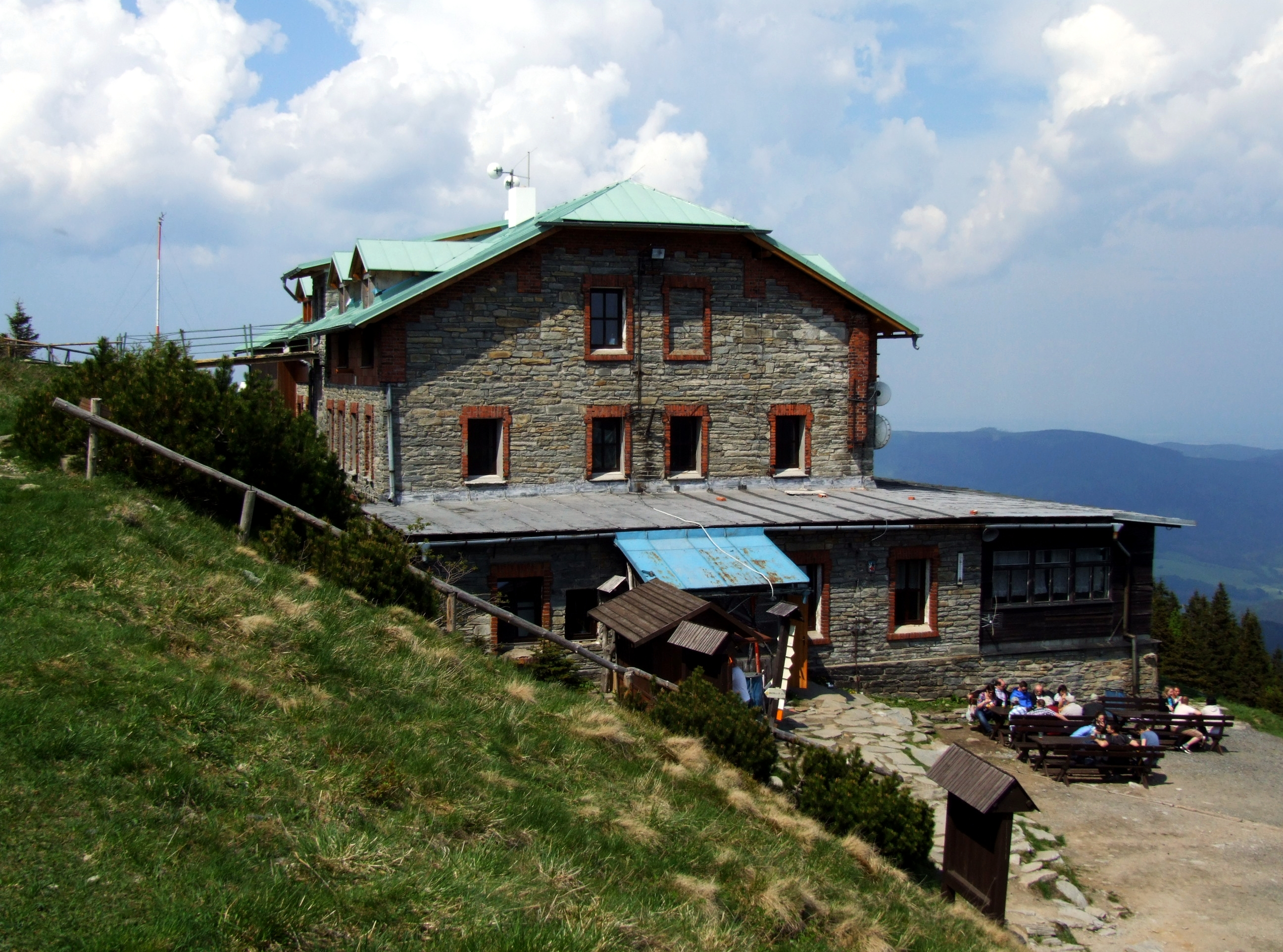
Jiřího na Šeráku mountain hut on Šerák

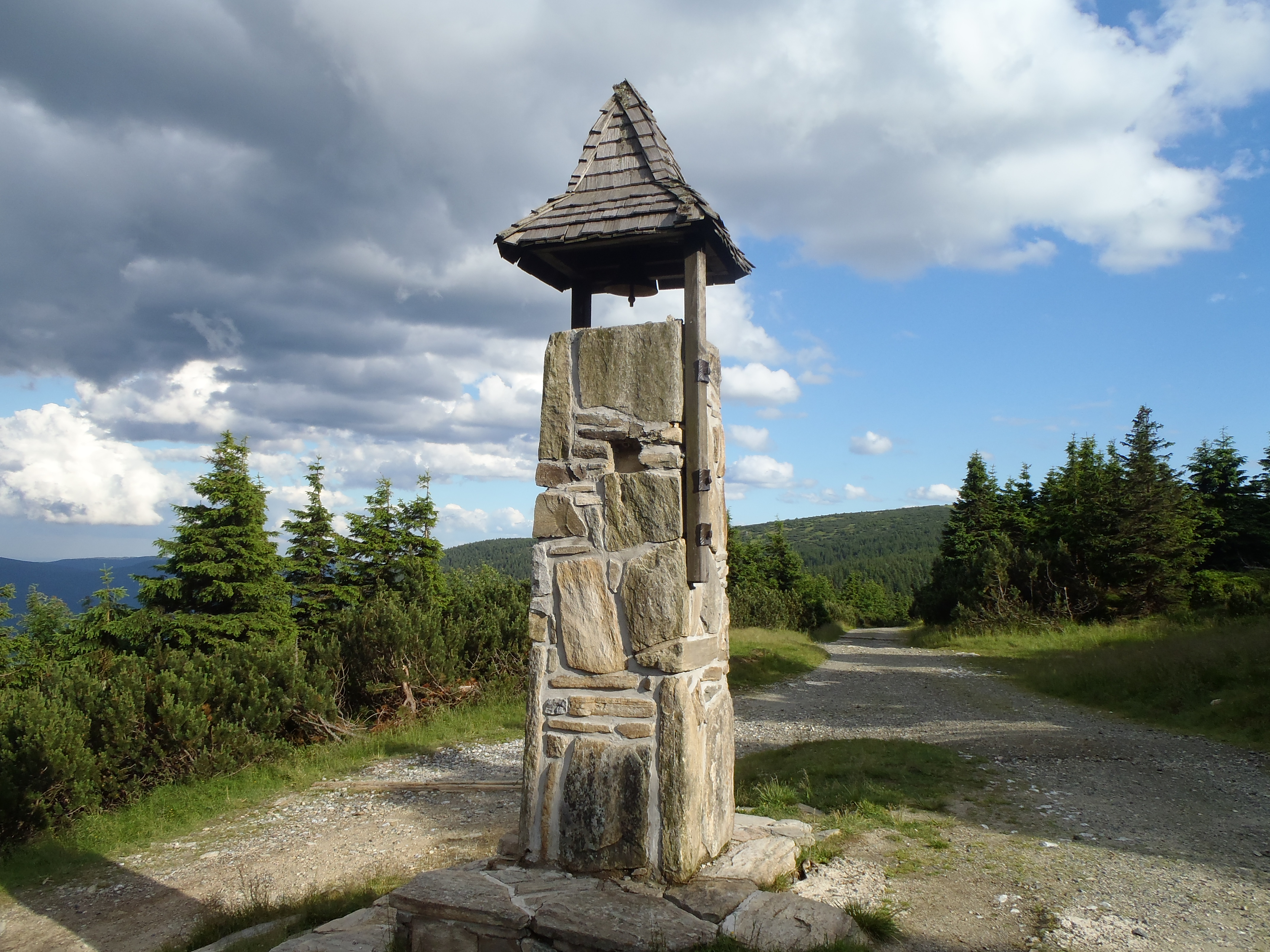
Bell tower near Jiřího hut

On the northeastern slope, about 170 m (560 ft) northeast of the summit, at 1,323 m (4,341 ft) above sea level, is the only active mountain hut - Jiřího hut (German: Georgschutzhaus). It is the oldest hut, built in 1888 by a tourist organization called the Moravian-Silesian Sudeten Mountain Society (German: Mährisch-Schlesischer Sudetengebirgverein (MSSGV)) with the participation of Cardinal Georg von Kopp, who donated the area for construction. From his name, the hut was named Jiřího hut in his memory. There is a weather station near the hut. In addition, there is a stone bell tower about 70 m (230 ft) south of the hut, at an elevation of about 1,325 m (4,347 ft) above sea level.

=== Main summit ===
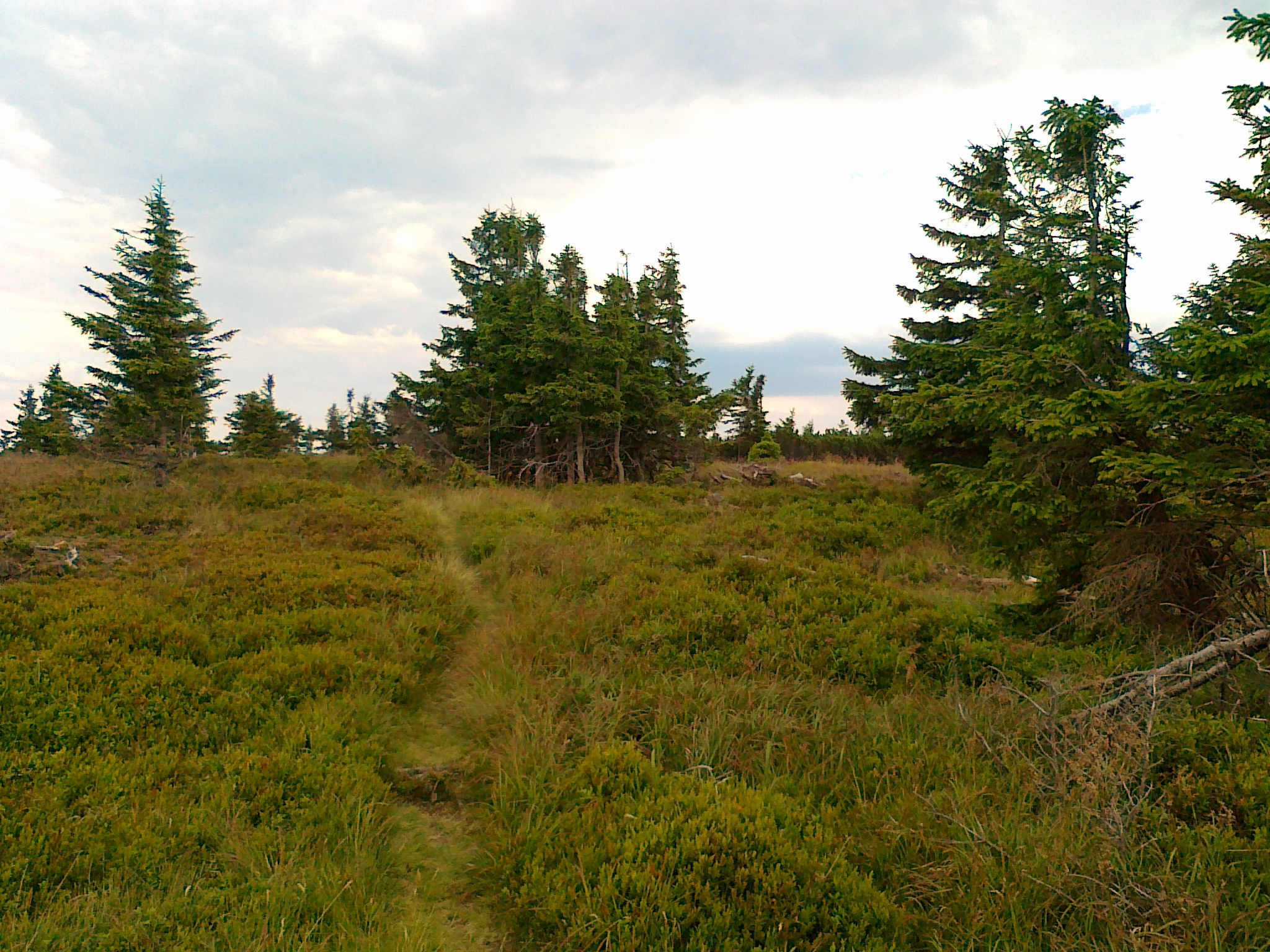
Peak slope of Šerák mountain

No hiking trail leads to the summit. The summit field is located in a small glade covered with patches of dwarf mountain pine and a much thinned spruce forest, covered with alpine grass. The summit is situated amongst a dense patch of dwarf mountain pine, and for this reason it is not a scenic viewpoint. On the summit slope there is a triangulation station, numbered 16 on the geodetic maps, with an elevation of 1,350.78 m (4,431.7 ft) above sea level and geographic coordinates 50°11′11.98″N 17°06′23.61″E, about 11 m (36 ft) northwest of the summit, with a mounted steel post visible near it. The State Administration of Land Surveying and Cadastre provides the summit as the highest point of the mountain with an elevation of 1,351.1 m (4,433 ft) above sea level and geographic coordinates 50°11′11.7″N 17°06′24.0″E.

Access to the summit is from the yellow hiking trail that runs near the summit slope, from which there is an approximate 70-meter long orientation path.

=== Secondary summit ===
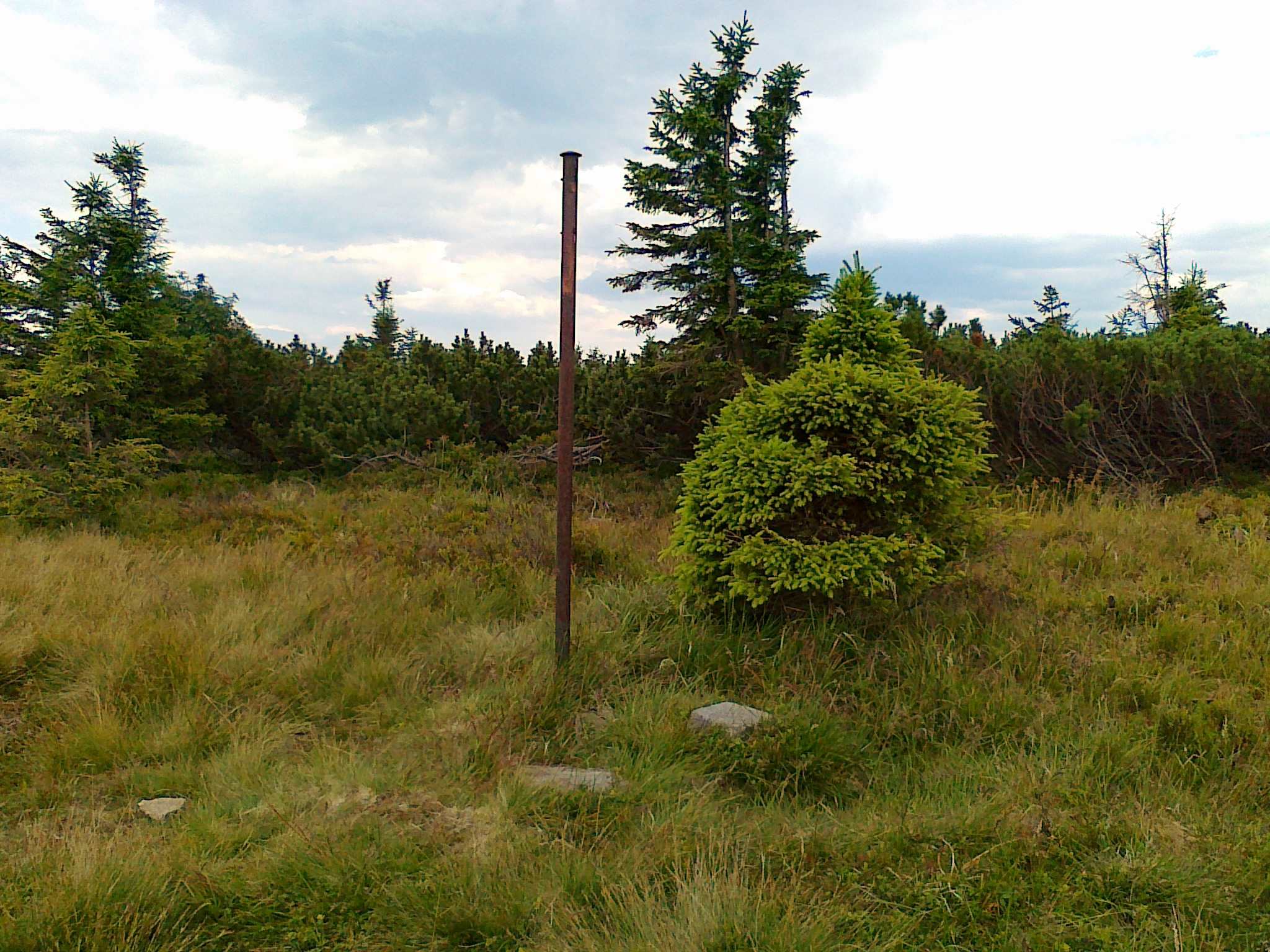
Triangulation station on the peak slope of Šerák Mountain

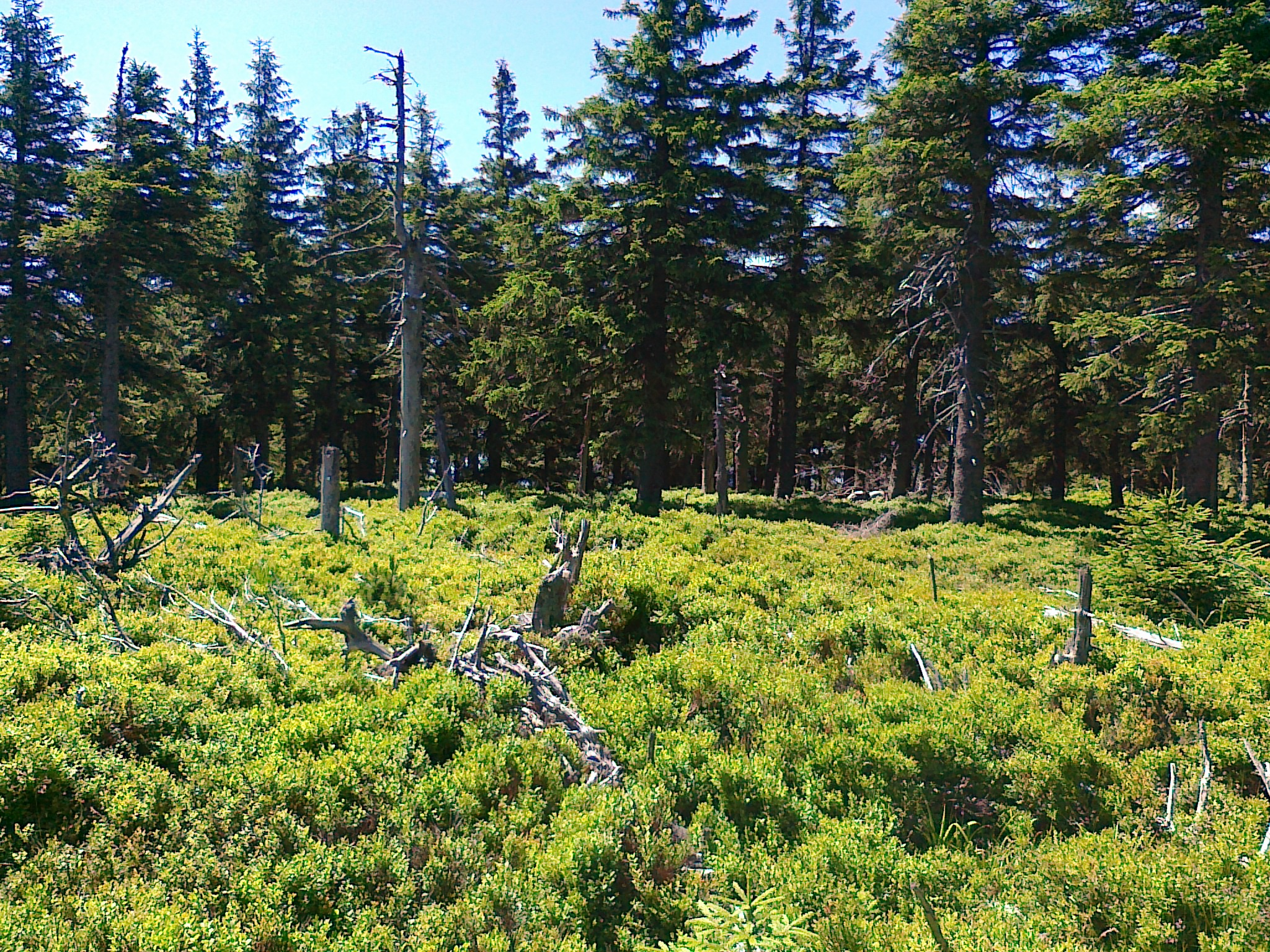
Peak slope of the secondary summit Šerák-JZ

Šerák is a mountain with a double summit. At a distance of about 640 m (2,100 ft) southwest of the main peak, a secondary peak identified as Šerák-JZ can be distinguished, with an elevation of 1,288 m (4,226 ft) above sea level and geographic coordinates 50°11′02.1″N 17°05′55.6″E, separated from the main peak by a not very prominent pass with an elevation of 1,286 m (4,219 ft) above sea level. The secondary summit of Šerák-JZ is located in the midst of a spruce forest, covered with, among other things, a very popular plant of the Hrubý Jeseník, namely the European blueberry. Due to the forestation it is not a scenic viewpoint and there is no triangulation station on it. Access to it is difficult, as it follows from the cutoff of the piste, from which it is necessary to walk an approximate 60 m (200 ft) long section in a side cutoff. Due to the protection of the valuable ecosystem of the entire Šerák-Keprník nature reserve established here, access to the secondary summit is not recommended.

=== Geology ===
Geologically, the massif of Šerák mountain belongs to the unit referred to as the Keprník dome and is composed of metamorphic rocks, mainly: gneisses (biotites), orthogneisses, erlangites, mylonites, blastomylonites, migmatites, schists, and magmatic rocks, mainly metagranites. The geological structure also partially contains admixtures of gemstones such as staurolite, andalusite, garnet and sillimanite.

=== Waters ===
The mountain lies on this border, on the drainage basins of the Baltic Sea (Oder river basin) on the northwestern, northern, northeastern and eastern slopes, and the Black Sea (Danube river basin) on the southern slope. The stream Javořický potok originates from the eastern slope.

=== Springs ===
There are numerous springs on the slopes.

Springs on the slopes of Šerák mountain
Number	Spring	Distance from the summit meters	Absolute altitude meters above sea level	Geographic coordinates
1	Pramen Antonius quelle	1640 to the east	907	50°11′56″N 17°07′08″E
2	Pramínek	935 to the southeast	1170	50°10′55″N 17°07′03″E
3	Studánka	2265 to the northeast	670	50°12′24″N 17°06′43″E
4	Studánka bez jména	615 to the north west	1180	50°11′31″N 17°06′14″E

=== Waterfalls ===
Waterfalls on the slopes of Šerák mountain
Number	Waterfall	Stream	Location	Absolute altitude meters above sea level	Waterfall elevation meters
1	Vodopád u Obřích skal	an unnamed tributary of Vražedný potok	northwestern slope, about 1.0 km northwest of the summit	975	5
2	Vodopád Ve Stržích	an unnamed tributary of Klepáčský potok	about 1.2 km northwest of the summit	1115–1160	4; 3; 3,5

== Climate ==
The summit has a subalpine climate (Köppen Dfc) with harsh conditions; average annual temperature is about 2.2 °C, average annual precipitation is about 1,200 mm, and snow cover within the mountain persists for about 180 days a year).

Climate data for Šerák, 1991–2020 normals, extremes 2004–present
Month	Jan	Feb	Mar	Apr	May	Jun	Jul	Aug	Sep	Oct	Nov	Dec	Year
Record high °C (°F)	9.5 (49.1)	10.9 (51.6)	13.9 (57.0)	21.4 (70.5)	24.1 (75.4)	25.5 (77.9)	27.1 (80.8)	27.1 (80.8)	25.7 (78.3)	22.3 (72.1)	16.0 (60.8)	8.9 (48.0)	27.1 (80.8)
Mean daily maximum °C (°F)	−3.0 (26.6)	−2.8 (27.0)	0.3 (32.5)	6.7 (44.1)	10.5 (50.9)	14.5 (58.1)	16.7 (62.1)	16.3 (61.3)	11.6 (52.9)	6.9 (44.4)	2.6 (36.7)	−1.2 (29.8)	6.6 (43.9)
Daily mean °C (°F)	−5.4 (22.3)	−5.2 (22.6)	−2.6 (27.3)	3.2 (37.8)	6.9 (44.4)	10.8 (51.4)	12.9 (55.2)	12.5 (54.5)	8.4 (47.1)	4.2 (39.6)	0.2 (32.4)	−3.5 (25.7)	3.5 (38.3)
Mean daily minimum °C (°F)	−7.6 (18.3)	−7.4 (18.7)	−4.9 (23.2)	0.3 (32.5)	4.0 (39.2)	7.9 (46.2)	9.8 (49.6)	9.7 (49.5)	6.0 (42.8)	2.0 (35.6)	−1.8 (28.8)	−5.7 (21.7)	1.0 (33.8)
Record low °C (°F)	−26.8 (−16.2)	−23.6 (−10.5)	−19.4 (−2.9)	−11.5 (11.3)	−6.9 (19.6)	−1.3 (29.7)	1.8 (35.2)	2.5 (36.5)	−2.4 (27.7)	−9.2 (15.4)	−13.1 (8.4)	−20.1 (−4.2)	−26.8 (−16.2)
Average precipitation mm (inches)	90.5 (3.56)	67.5 (2.66)	79.2 (3.12)	69.4 (2.73)	126.0 (4.96)	140.9 (5.55)	133.8 (5.27)	116.5 (4.59)	118.4 (4.66)	83.8 (3.30)	72.8 (2.87)	78.2 (3.08)	1,177.1 (46.34)
Average snowfall cm (inches)	88.6 (34.9)	67.1 (26.4)	62.9 (24.8)	32.6 (12.8)	5.1 (2.0)	0.0 (0.0)	0.0 (0.0)	0.0 (0.0)	1.6 (0.6)	16.1 (6.3)	38.6 (15.2)	65.8 (25.9)	378.4 (149.0)
Average relative humidity (%)	88.5	88.9	87.3	78.5	82.2	82.3	79.5	80.6	85.9	87.5	89.8	88.5	85.0
Mean monthly sunshine hours	51.6	55.7	109.1	173.0	174.3	174.9	200.1	193.5	143.5	108.2	60.0	48.9	1,492.9
Source: Czech Hydrometeorological Institute

== Nature conservation ==
The summit area and parts of all slopes are located within the Šerák-Keprník nature reserve, which is part of the Jeseníky Protected Landscape Area, and was established to protect rock, earth and plant formations, as well as rare animal species.

Along the red trail blazing, a nature trail named S Koprníčkem na výlet Keprnickými horami was created on the route:

- Červenohorské sedlo – Ramzová (with 13 observation posts)

=== Šerák-Keprník National Nature Reserve ===
The Šerák-Keprník nature reserve is located at an elevation of 852–1423 m above sea level, has an area of 794.30 hectares (with a protective buffer zone of up to 1169.83 hectares), and was established on December 31, 1933 to protect a number of preserved rock and soil formations formed as a result of the harsh climate of the ice age, such as cryoplanation terraces, frost seams and so-called hummocks, as well as the flora and fauna found in their area. The reserve is open to tourists. There are both hiking and cycling trails running through it, as well as a nature trail.

== Tourism ==
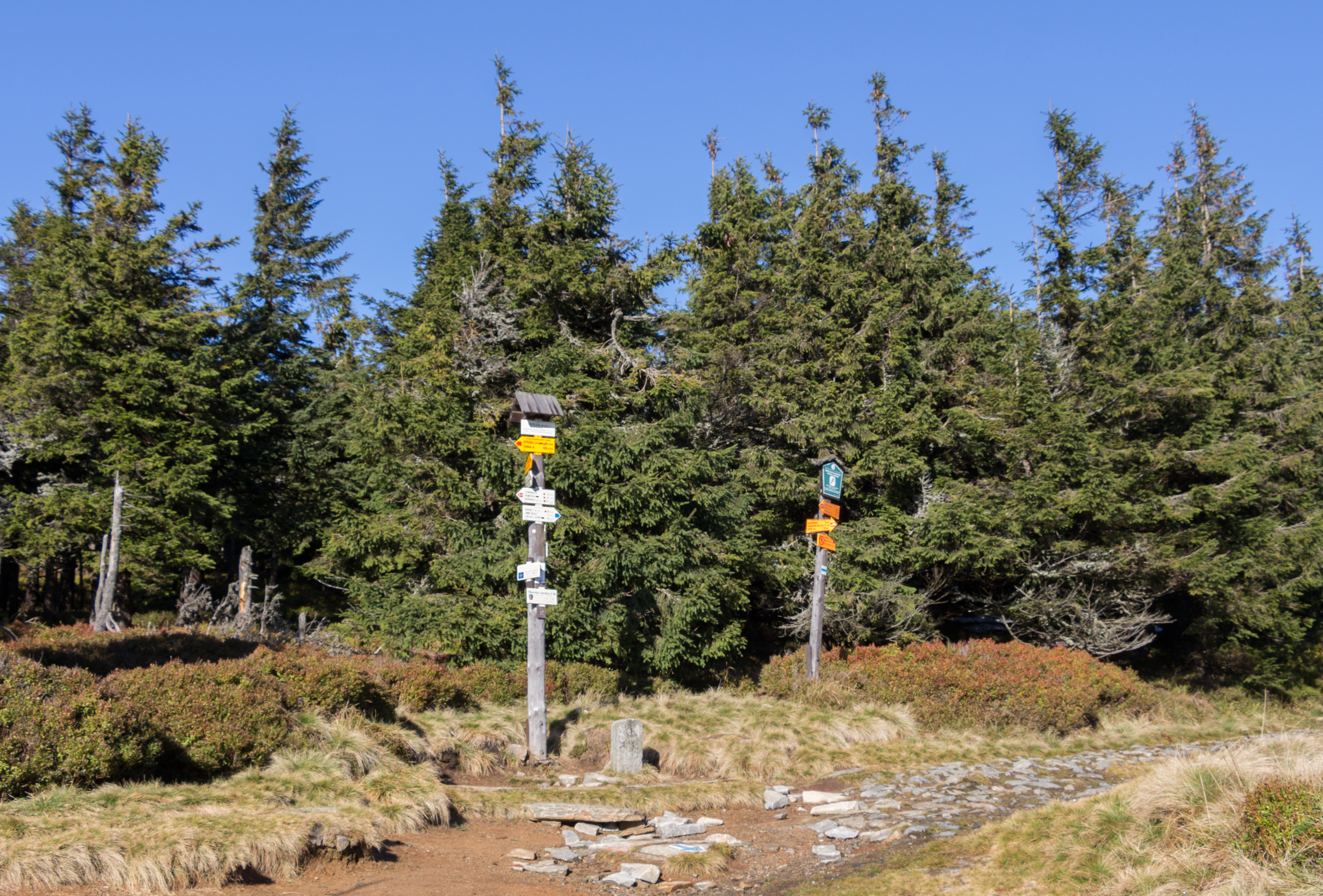
Šerák (rozc.) tourist intersection

Šerák is one of the most popular peaks in the Hrubý Jeseník range. The mountain is an active destination for hiking, biking, skiing and snowboarding. It is located between key tourist destinations in the Keprník mountain. The easiest access to the summit is by cable transport from the settlement of Ramzová. The cable transport was opened in 1981. The lower part on the Ramzová – Černava mountain route was renovated in 1996 and is 1,400 m (4,600 ft) long with a 4-chairlift, while the upper part on the Černava mountain – Šerák mountain route is 1,810 m (5,940 ft) long with a 2-chairlift and an end station located at 1,326 m (4,350 ft) above sea level, some 190 m (620 ft) southwest of the summit.

The key tourist point is a hiking intersection located about 300 m (980 ft) southeast of the peak, named Šerák (rozc.) with an elevation of 1,319 m (4,327 ft), given on the information board, from which two hiking trails, a cycling trail, a nature trail and cross-country ski trails diverge.

=== Hiking trails ===
Czech Tourist Club has established four trail blazings within the mountain on routes:

- Červenohorské sedlo – Červená hora mountain – Vřesová studánka spring – Sedlo pod Vřesovkou pass – Keprník-JV – Trojmezí – Keprník summit – Sedlo pod Keprníkem pass – Šerák mountain – Mračná hora – Černava mountain – Ramzová
- Lipová-lázně – Sněhulák mountain – Strmý mountain – Obří skály mountain – Šerák mountain – Sedlo pod Keprníkem pass – Šumný mountain – Točník mountain – Filipovice
- Ramzovské sedlo pass – Ramzová railway station – Černava mountain – Obří skály mountain
- Jeseník – Javořík-SV mountain – Javořík mountain – Sedlo pod Javoříkem pass – Miroslav mountain – Strmý mountain – Šerák mountain – Šerák (lanovka)

Web portals dedicated to hiking in the Hrubý Jeseník offer tourists of the Ramzová settlement a circular combined route consisting of the course of various trails.

=== Cycling trails ===
On the slopes of the mountain, two cycling trails have been designated on the routes:

- Spojená cesta - Ztracený vrch mountain - Zaječí hora mountain - Šumná-JV - Šumná mountain - Nad Borovým mountain - Borový potok stream valley - Bělá pod Pradědem mountain - Žalostná mountain - Šumný mountain - Sedlo pod Keprníkem pass - Šerák mountain - Mračná hora - Černava mountain - Ostružná mountain - Petříkov
- Adolfovice - Javořický potok valley - Sedlo pod Javoříkem pass - Miroslav mountain - Šerák mountain - Obří skály mountain - Černava mountain - Ramzová - Klín mountain - Mramorový vrch mountain - Kopřivný mountain - Oblý vrch mountain - Lví hora mountain - Smrek mountain - Luční vrch

=== Ski trails ===
During the snowy period, from the southwestern slope, you can use the designated longest piste in the Czech Republic with a total length of 3,260 m (10,700 ft), with an intermediate level of difficulty, which belongs to the ski resort named Lyžařské středisko Bonera-Ramzová with the following course:

Šerák – Mračná hora – Černava mountain – Ramzová

Along cycling and some hiking trails, cross-country skiing trails have been established, including a route called Jesenická magistrála.

== Additional information related to the name of the mountain ==
Hanušovice's Holba brewery produces a light beer called Šerák.

== Bibliography ==
- Banaszkiewicz, Piotr; Parzewski, Jerzy (2019). Jesioniki, Góry Opawskie. Mapa turystyczna: skala 1:50 000 (in Polish and Czech) (1 ed.). Cracow: Wydawnictwo Kartograficzne "Compass". ISBN 9788376059419. OCLC 1150586280.
- Brygier, Waldemar; Gałęcki, Adam; Jońca, Rafał; Sibielec, Monika; Wojciechowski, Dariusz (2017). Jesioniki. Pradziad, Jeseník: skala 1:40 000 (in Polish and Czech) (4 ed.). Wrocław: Studio Plan. ISBN 9788365689757. OCLC 1036547484.
- Chráněná Krajinná Oblast Jeseníky sever. Turistická a cykloturistická mapa 1:25 000. Eurocart (in Czech) (1 ed.). Česká Lípa: Geodézie On Line. 2010. ISBN 9788087380178. OCLC 865043841.
- Cymerman, Zbigniew (1998). "Spory o podział geologiczny Sudetów. (PDF)". Przegląd Geologiczny (in Czech). 46 (6): 530–536. ISSN 0033-2151. OCLC 995455330. Archived from the original on 2018-12-11.
- Česká geologická služba. "Geologická mapa 1:50 000". mapy.geology.cz (in Czech).
- "Geoprohlížeč – ZÚ (Geoportal Czech)". ags.cuzk.cz (in Czech). Český Úřad Zeměměřický a Katastrální.
- "Historie jesenické přírody. (PDF)" (PDF). jeseniky.ochranaprirody.cz (in Czech). Archived from the original (PDF) on 2021-11-13.
- Hnutí DUHA a přátelé Jeseníků (2002). "Analýza vlivu lesního hospodaření na lesní ekosystémy v CHKO Jeseníky. (PDF)" (PDF). hnutiduha.cz (in Czech). Archived from the original (PDF) on 2022-08-11.
- "Hrubý Jeseník (mapa) (JPEG)". dudisoft.eu (in Czech). Archived from the original on 2016-03-04.
- Jeseníky – Praděd, Králický Sněžník. Turistická mapa 1:40 000 (in Czech). Zádveřice: SHOCart. 2018. ISBN 9788072247363. OCLC 1103831608.
- "Przegląd Rezerwatów przyrody. (PDF)" (PDF). powiat.nysa.pl (in Polish, Czech, and German). Archived from the original (PDF) on 2019-12-31.
- "View". heywhatsthat.com.
- "Wysoki Jesionik (mapa turystyczna) 1:192 000". pl.mapy.cz (in Czech and Polish).
