= Černava (mountain) =

Mountain in the Czech Republic

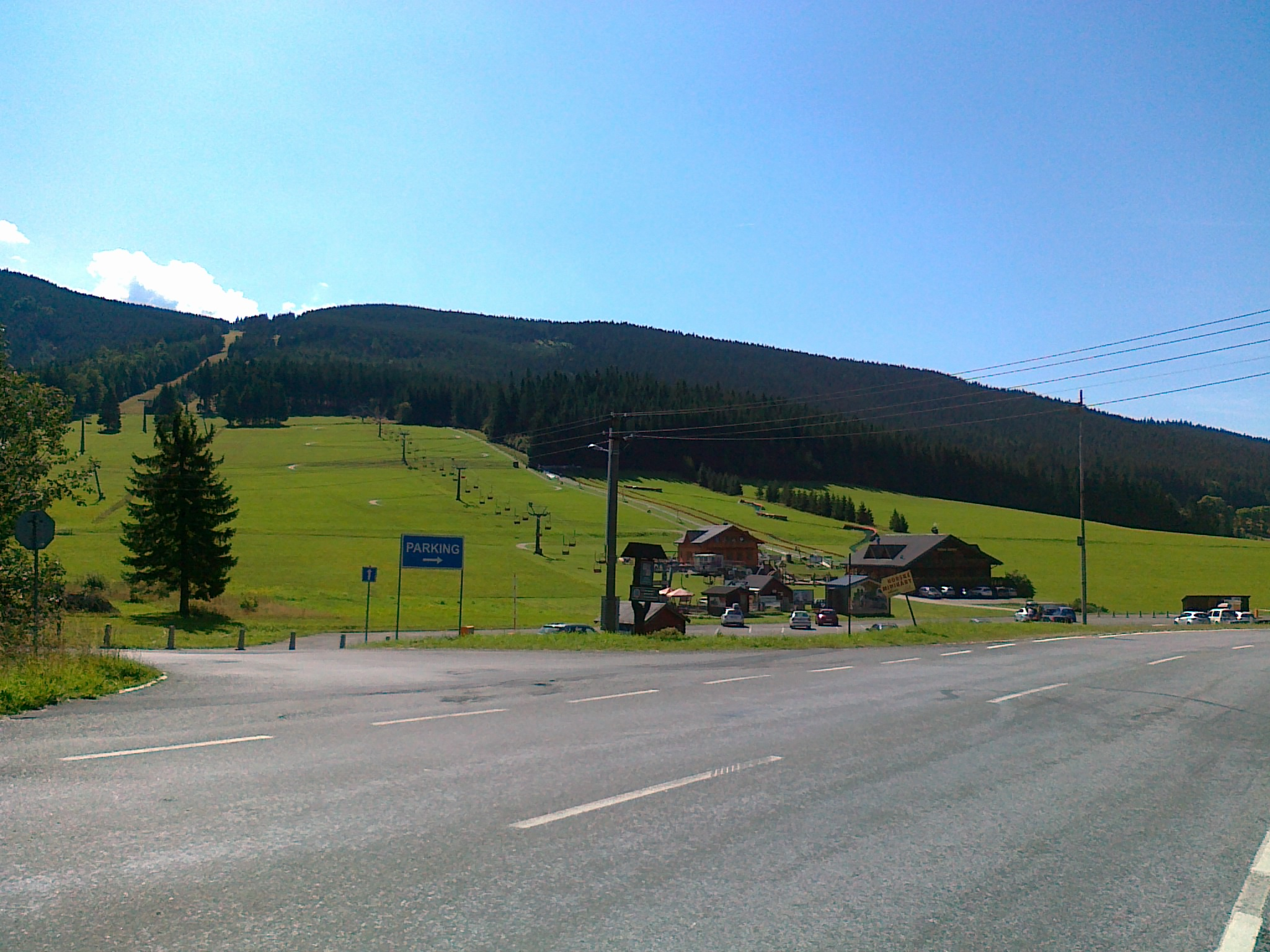
- View of Černava from Ramzová

Highest point
- Elevation: 1,103 m (3,619 ft)
- Prominence: 35 m (115 ft)

Geography
- Location within Czech Republic
- Location: Ostružná
- Parent range: Hrubý Jeseník

Černava (German: Schwarz Küppel) is a mountain in the Hrubý Jeseník mountain range in the Czech Republic. It has an elevation of 1,103 m (3,619 ft) above sea level. It is located in the municipality of Ostružná, near the village of Ramzová.

== Description ==
=== Location ===
Černava is located in the northern region of the entire range of the Hrubý Jeseník mountains, within the geomorphological microregion of Keprník Mountains. It is situated near the border with the neighboring range called the Hanušovice Highlands, lying on its main ridge, which runs from the Červenohorské sedlo to the Ramzovské sedlo. Černava is positioned as the last mountain on this ridge, right at the Ramzovské sedlo.

Due to its shape and height, Černava is a difficult mountain to recognize compared to the significantly higher mountains in this range, making its identification challenging. From the nearby road No. 369 Lipová-lázně–Olšany, it can be seen from the village of Ostružná or Ramzová, where it is most recognizable. From the road surrounding the peak area of Praděd, it is invisible, obscured by the much higher Červená hora mountain. Similarly, from another notable viewpoint – the road encircling the summit of Dlouhé stráně – Černava is also hidden, this time by Vozka mountain.

Černava is bounded by:

- the Klepáčský potok stream valley from the southeast and south;
- a border pass with an elevation of 692 m above sea level towards the Prostřední stráň peak (located in the Hanušovice Highlands) from the southwest;
- the Branná river valley from the west;
- two passes from the northwest: the first, Ramzová, towards Klín peak, and the second, with an elevation of 758 m above sea level, towards Ovčí vrch (2) peak; (Note: Designated as indexed to distinguish it from another peak with the same name, Ovčí vrch (1), located approximately 1.5 km east of the town of Karlova Studánka within the same range.)
- an unnamed creek, one of the tributaries of the Ramzovský potok from the north;
- a pass with an elevation of 1,070 m above sea level towards Mračná hora peak from the northeast.

The surrounding summits include:

- from the northeast: Mramorový vrch–JZ (located in the Golden Mountains), Obří skály, Mračná hora, and Šerák–JZ;
- from the southeast: Keprník, Keprník–JV, and Vozka;
- from the south: Polom and Černá stráň–S;
- from the southwest: Troják, Troják–SZ, Tři kameny, Ptačí pláň, Prostřední stráň, and Pod nádražím;
- from the west: an unnamed peak with an elevation of 749 m above sea level;
- from the northwest: Stráž–JV, an unnamed peak with an elevation of 781 m above sea level (the last seven peaks are in the Hanušovice Highlands), Klín (in the Golden Mountains), and Ovčí vrch (2); (Note: Designated as indexed to distinguish it from another peak with the same name, Ovčí vrch (1), located approximately 1.5 km east of the town of Karlova Studánka within the same range.)
- from the north: Vápenný kopec (in the Golden Mountains).

=== Slopes ===
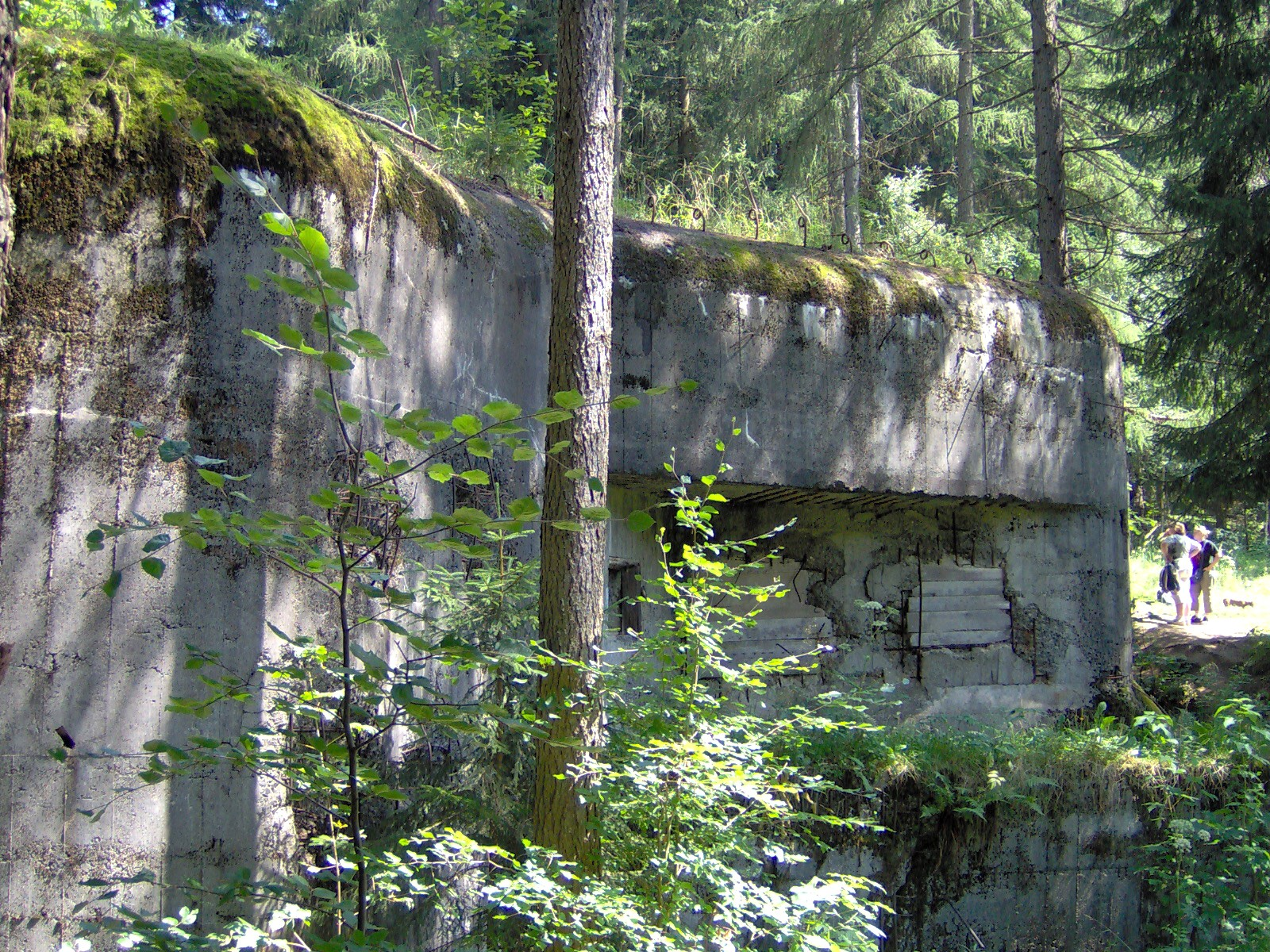
Bunker Pěchotní srub STM 52 Obora (2009)

Within the mountain, six main slopes can be distinguished:

- southeastern slope
- southern slope
- southwestern slope named Farský vrch
- western slope
- northwestern slope
- northeastern slope

All types of forestation are present: spruce forest, mixed forest, (Note: The forest stand of the entire Jeseníky Protected Landscape Area includes: European spruce 84%, European beech 10%, European larch 1.5%, sycamore maple 1.1%, birch 1%, common alder 0.8%, dwarf mountain pine 0.4%, grey alder 0.3%, (European silver fir, European ash, and linden) 0.2%, Scotch pine 0.1%, and others (Pinus mugo, oak, hornbeam, Norway maple, elm, rowan, green alder, aspen, poplar, and goat willow) 0.2%.) and deciduous forest, with dense spruce forest predominating. On all slopes except the northwestern and northeastern slopes, mixed forest areas appear as the elevation decreases. Deciduous forest patches are found on the southwestern, western, and northwestern slopes, and even meadows emerge at the base of these slopes. Small clearings are present on nearly all slopes, and significant slope clearings, with ski trails and accompanying lifts, are found on the northwestern slope. Numerous rock groups occur along the southwestern slope, while two larger solitary rocks are near the secondary summit Černava–JZ on the southern slope, and small boulder fields are at the base of the southwestern and western slopes. A 22 kV overhead power line runs through the village of Ostružná at the base of the southwestern and western slopes.

In 1938, a network of concrete infantry bunkers, marked as Pěchotní srub STM 52 Obora, was built along the southwest slope. Additionally, a Mountain Rescue Station (Czech: Stanice HS Ramzová) is located at the base of the northwest slope near the village of Ramzová. About 730 m northwest of the peak (northwestern slope), near the red tourist trail and a spring called Dobrá Voda, there is a small stone chapel named Svatá Voda.

The slopes have relatively uniform and varied inclines. The average slope gradient ranges from 6° (northeastern slope) to 18° (southeastern slope). The average gradient of all mountain slopes (weighted arithmetic mean of slope gradients) is approximately 12°. The maximum average gradient of the southern slope, at elevations around 890 m above sea level near the rock group, does not exceed 40° over a 50-meter section. The slopes are covered with a network of roads and generally unmarked paths and trails.

=== Main summit ===
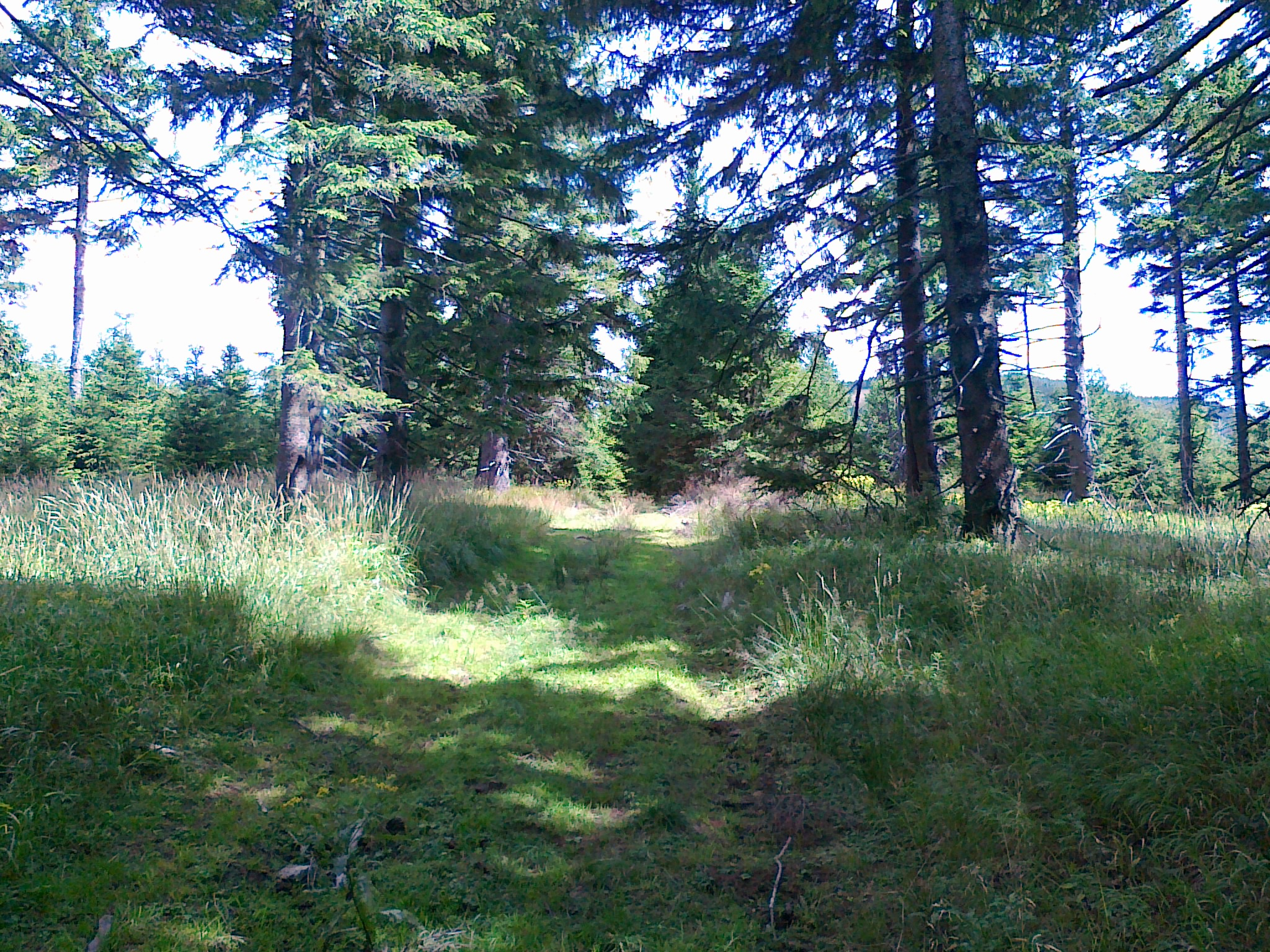
View of the summit dome of Černava

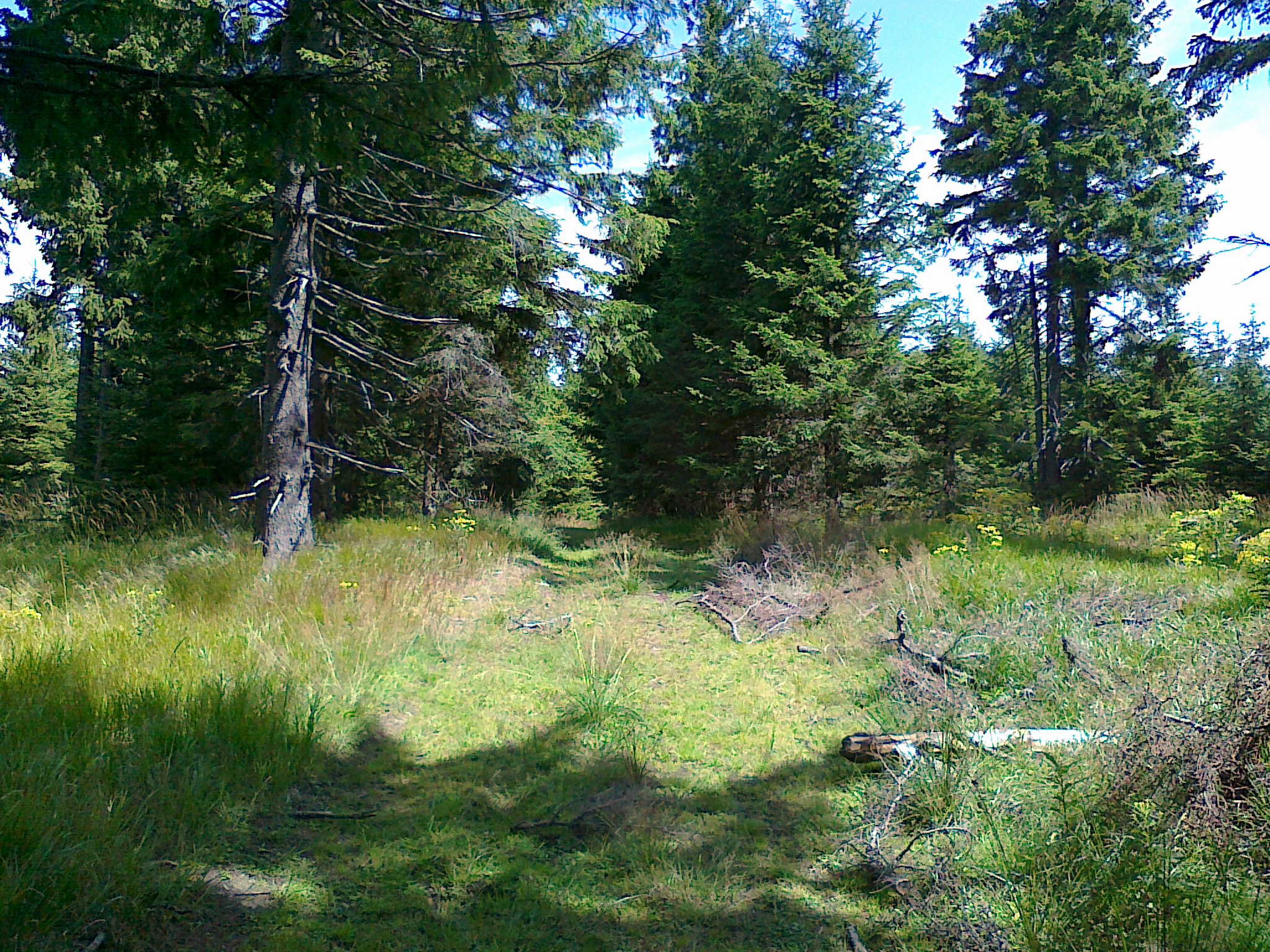
Summit area of Černava

No marked tourist trail leads to the main summit, which is near the main ridge road (marked by two horizontal white stripes on tree trunks) connecting both the main and secondary summits. It is located in a spruce forest area, covered with alpine grass. Due to the forestation, it does not offer scenic viewpoints. At the summit, there is a triangulation station marked on geodetic maps as number 15.1, with an elevation of 1,103.0 m above sea level and coordinates 50°10′45.78″N 17°04′43.70″E. Additionally, about 20 m southwest of the summit, there is another triangulation station, marked as number 15.2, with an elevation of 1,102.6 m above sea level and coordinates 50°10′45.47″N 17°04′42.76″E.

=== Secondary summit ===
Černava is a mountain with a double peak. About 1.2 km southwest of the main summit, there is a secondary peak called Černava–JZ with an elevation of 950 m above sea level and coordinates 50°10′22.8″N 17°03′50.2″E, separated from the main summit by a low pass with an elevation of 941 m above sea level. The secondary summit Černava–JZ is located on the edge of a small clearing, near the main ridge road, which runs through the pass connecting it to the main summit. Due to the forestation, it also does not offer scenic viewpoints. On the secondary summit, there is a triangulation station marked as number 21. on geodetic maps, with an elevation of 946.51 m above sea level and coordinates 50°10′23.71″N 17°03′51.57″E, located about 43 m northeast of the secondary summit.

=== Geology ===
Geologically, the Černava massif belongs to a unit called the Keprník Dome and is composed of metamorphic rocks, mainly phyllites (biotites), amphibolites, blasto-mylonites, metamorphic schists, and partially marbles. The geological structure also includes traces of gemstones such as staurolite, andalusite, garnet, and sillimanite.

=== Waters ===
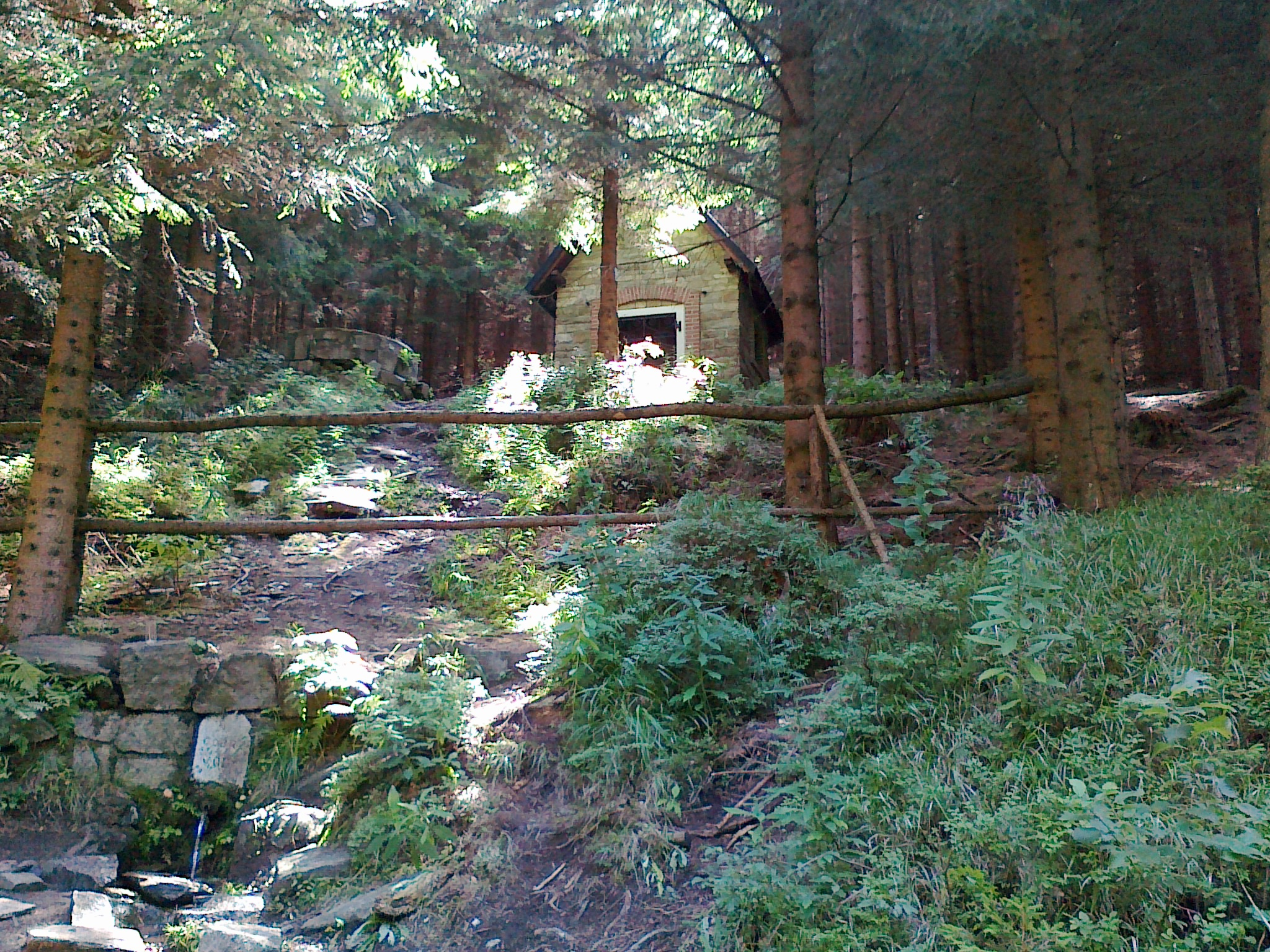
Dobrá Voda spring, with the Svatá Voda chapel visible above

Almost all slopes of Černava belongs to the Black Sea basin. Water from this part of the Hrubý Jeseník mountains flows into the Danube river basin, extending to the Branná river and its short, unnamed slope streams, or the Klepáčský potok and its short, unnamed slope streams. Small parts of the northwestern slope, running approximately from the summit through the designated ski trails to the Ramzovské sedlo, belong to the Baltic Sea basin, with water flowing into the Oder river basin, continuing from the Ramzovský potok. Due to the relatively gentle slopes, there are no waterfalls or cascades on the mountain. Numerous springs are present on the slopes.

Springs on the slopes of Černava
Number	Source	Distance from summit (m)	Absolute height (m above sea level	Coordinates
1	Dobrá Voda	730 northwest	910	50°11′04″N 17°04′20″E
2	Studánka	1,770 northwest	756	50°11′34″N 17°03′57″E
3	Studánka	690 west	970	50°10′43″N 17°04′08″E

== Nature preservation ==
The entire mountain lies within the designated protected area known as the Jeseníky Protected Landscape Area, established to preserve rock formations, soil, plant life, and rare animal species. There are no nature reserves or nature monuments on its slopes.

=== Educational trails ===
Along the red tourist trail, an educational trail called NS S Koprníčkem na výlet Keprnickými horami was established, running on the route from Červenohorské sedlo to Ramzová (with 13 observation points).

Additionally, at the foot of the southwestern slope, there is a partially established educational trail called NS Pasák on a circular route:

Branná – Pasák Nature Monument – Branná (with 14 observation points)

== Tourism ==
=== Hiking trails ===
The Czech Tourist Club has marked four hiking trails in the area:

Červenohorské sedlo – Červená hora – Vřesová studánka spring – Sedlo pod Vřesovkou Pass – Keprník–JV – Trojmezí – Keprník summit – Sedlo pod Keprníkem Pass – Šerák – Mračná hora – Černava – Ramzová

Ramzovska Pass – Ramzová railway station – Černava – Obří skály

Ostružná – Branná river valley – Branná

Nad Dobrou vodou – Černava – Černava–JZ – Nad Splavem

=== Cycling routes ===
There are two cycling routes traversing the slopes:

Spojená cesta – Ztracený vrch – Zaječí hora – Šumná–JV – Šumná – Nad Borovým – Borový stream valley – Bělá pod Pradědem – Žalostná – Šumný – Sedlo pod Keprníkem Pass – Šerák – Mračná hora – Černava – Ostružná – Petříkov

Adolfovice – Javořický Stream Valley – Sedlo pod Javoříkem Pass – Miroslav – Šerák – Obří skály – Černava – Ramzová – Klín – Klínec – Mramorový vrch – Kopřivný – Oblý vrch – Lví hora – Smrek – Luční vrch

=== Ski and karting tracks ===
During snowy periods, the area around the mountain offers cross-country skiing routes marked on the hiking and cycling trails, including a route called the Jesenická magistrála along the red hiking trail.

Černava also features downhill skiing trails within two ski resorts: Skiareál Bonera – Ramzová and Ski arena R3 - Ramzová.

Main downhill skiing trails with lifts from Černava
Number	Trail and marking	Length of the trail (m)	Height difference (m)	Type of lift	Length of lift (m)
1	1	340	120	T-bar lift	500
2	1	1,400	272	4-chair lift	1,459
3	2	1,300	272	4-chair lift	1,459
4	6 (Note: The longest downhill skiing trail in the Czech Republic, with a total length of 3,260 m, runs not only along the slope of Černava but also along the slopes of Šerák and Mračná hora.)	3,260	550	4-chair lift and 2-chair lift	1,459 and 1,810
5	7 (Note: The trail is artificially illuminated after dark.)	400	20	T-bar lift	500
6	Skiarena R3 (Note: The trail is artificially illuminated after dark.)	560	90	chairlift	560

Additionally, above Penzion Haltmar on the slopes of Černava, a special track has been built for snow tubing (Note: Snowtubing – sliding down a snow or snow-ice track (chute) on special rubber slides commonly referred to as tires, inner tubes, or rafts.) or snow carting (during snow periods) (Note: Snowcart – a steerable, shock-absorbed vehicle with skates, featuring a seat and two foot brakes.) and for mountain karting (from May to October). (Note: Mountain go-kart – a special, non-motorized, steerable, framed wheeled vehicle, consisting of a seat and equipped with brakes.)

Snow tubing, Snow carting, and mountain karting tracks on Černava
Number	Marking	Length of the track (m)	Length of the lift (m)
1	or	500	350
2		855	350
