= Červená hora (Hrubý Jeseník) =

Mountain in the Czech Republic

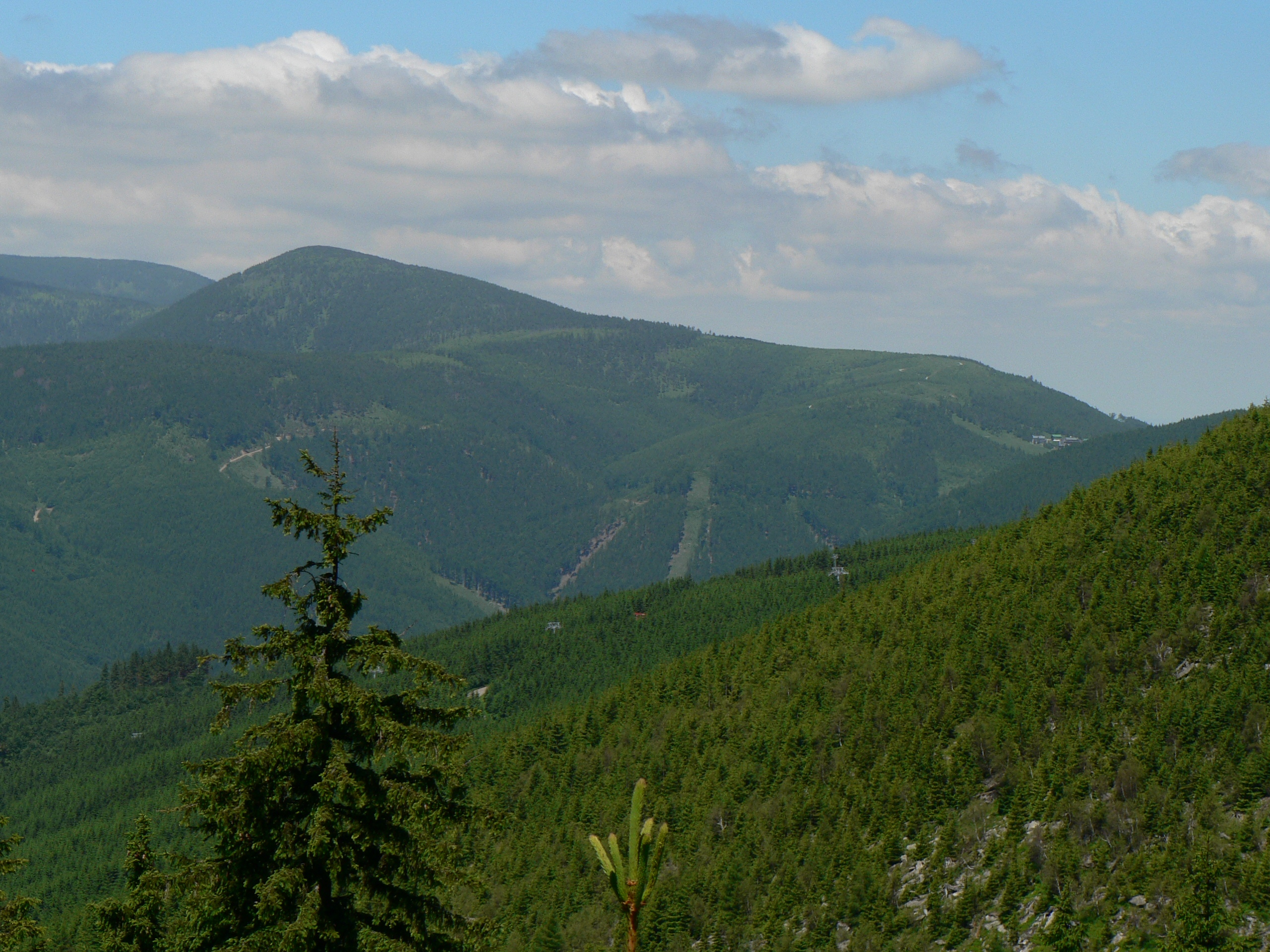
- Červená hora visible from the Mravenečník mountain

Highest point
- Elevation: 1,333 m (4,373 ft)
- Prominence: 130 m (430 ft)
- Isolation: 2 km (1.2 mi)
- Coordinates: 50°8′39″N 17°8′10″E

Geography
- Location within Czech Republic
- Location: Loučná nad Desnou
- Parent range: Hrubý Jeseník

Červená hora (German: Rothe Berg) is a mountain in the Hrubý Jeseník mountain range in the Czech Republic. It has an elevation of 1,333 m (4,373 ft) above sea level. It is located in the municipality of Loučná nad Desnou, on the historical border between Silesia and Moravia.

== History ==
=== Legend associated with the mountain ===
A legend is tied to the name of the mountain about a monk who, having lost his way, was forced to spend the night on this mountain under the open sky. As he lay down and covered himself with his habit, he heard the threatening roar of bears and the howling of wolves. In the face of danger, he drew a circle around himself and large crosses in the direction of all the cardinal points. The predators circled around the circle but did not dare to enter it. The terrified monk was drenched in bloody sweat, staining the entire area red. As morning arrived, the animals departed, and the monk was saved. From then on, the mountain began to be called Červená hora (Red Mountain).

=== Plane crash ===
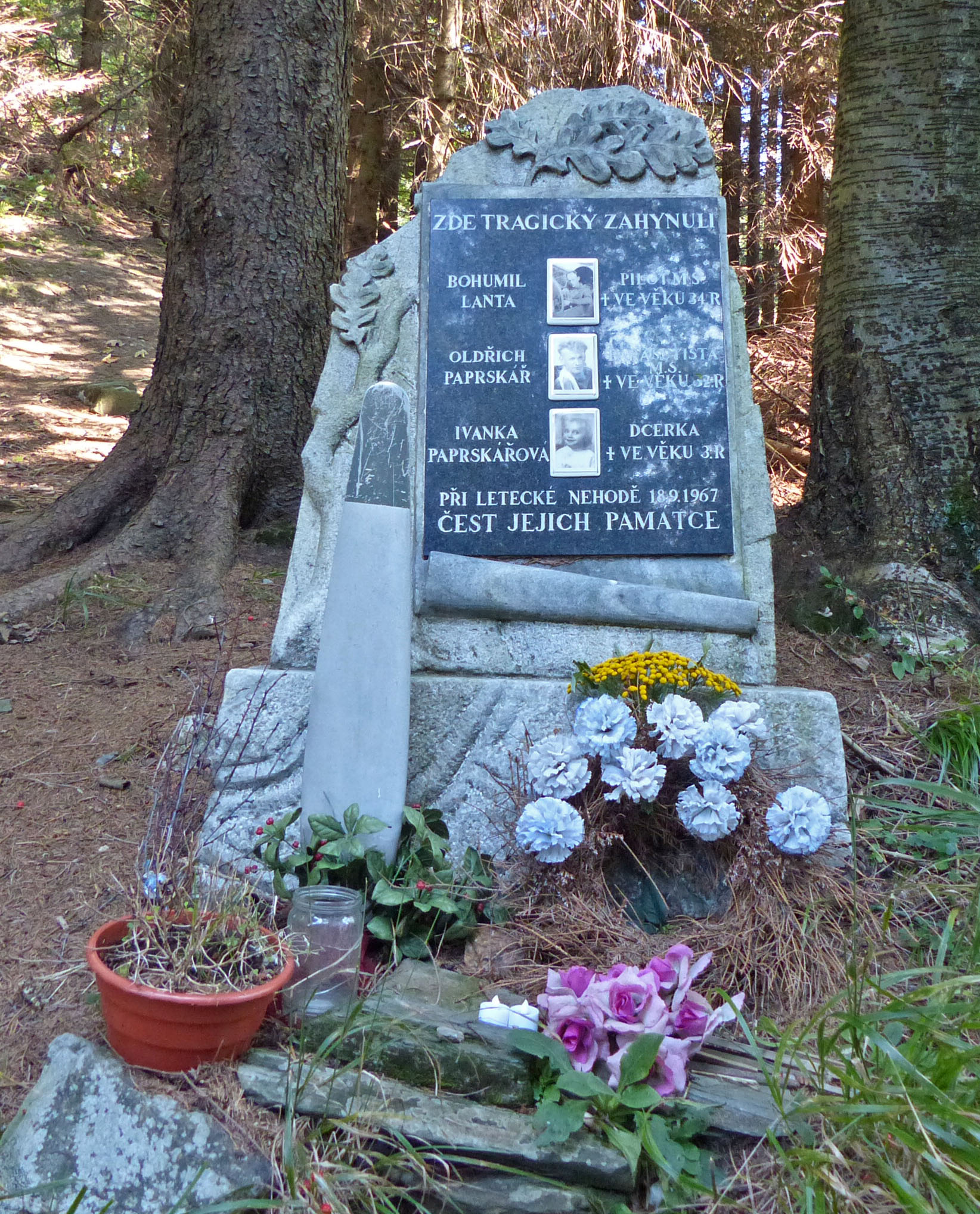
Memorial to victims of plane crash on Červená hora

On 18 September 1967, a sports plane belonging to the Šumperk Aeroclub, an Orličan L-40 Meta Sokol model, crashed on the slope of Červená hora near the Červenohorské sedlo pass during a sightseeing flight. On board, besides the pilot, was the four-member Paprskář family (a parachutist with his wife and two daughters). The crash claimed the lives of three people: the pilot Bohumil Lanta, the parachutist Oldřich Paprskář, and his three-year-old daughter Ivanka Paprskářová. At the crash site, about 2.2 km southeast of the summit, at an elevation of around 1,024 metres, a memorial with a plaque listing the names of the deceased was erected along the road.

== Characteristics ==
=== Location ===
The summit of Červená hora is roughly situated between the Červenohorské sedlo pass and the distinctive peak of Vozka mountain, which is recognizable by a visible tooth-shaped formation in the rock group. The mountain can be seen from the road encircling the summit area of Praděd, as it is slightly to the right when looking towards Vozka or from another prominent viewpoint, such as the road surrounding the peak of Dlouhé stráně.

Červená hora is located in the northwestern part of the Hrubý Jeseník range, within the middle-eastern region of a microregion called the Keprník Mountains. It is the fifth highest peak in the Keprník Mountains, after Keprník, Vozka, Žalostná, and Šerák, lying on the main ridge that stretches from Červenohorské sedlo to the Ramzovské sedlo pass.

The mountain is bordered by several geographical features:

- to the northeast by a pass at 1,140 metres above sea level towards Točník
- to the north by the valley of the Černý potok stream
- to the east by the valley of the Červenohorský potok stream
- to the southeast by the Červenohorské sedlo pass
- to the south by a pass at 988 metres towards Skalký u Červenohorského sedla and another pass at 1,109 metres towards Šindelná hora
- to the west by the valley of the Hučivá Desná stream
- to the northwest by the Sedlo pod Vřesovkou pass.

Surrounding peaks include:

- Točník to the northeast
- Jeřáb, Velký Klín, Velký Klín–JZ, Velký Klínovec, and Skalký u Červenohorského sedla to the southeast
- Šindelná hora to the south
- Klínová hora to the southwest
- Spálený vrch and Spálený vrch–SV to the west
- Keprník–JV to the northwest.

=== Slopes ===
All slopes of Červená hora are forested, predominantly with mixed forests, (Note: The forest stand of the entire Jeseníky Protected Landscape Area includes: European spruce 84%, European beech 10%, European larch 1.5%, sycamore maple 1.1%, birch 1%, common alder 0.8%, dwarf mountain pine 0.4%, grey alder 0.3%, (European silver fir, European ash, and linden) 0.2%, Scotch pine 0.1%, and others (Pinus mugo, oak, hornbeam, Norway maple, elm, rowan, green alder, aspen, poplar, and goat willow) 0.2%.) fragments of spruce forests, or deciduous forests, featuring numerous clearings, meadows, and thinning areas. Outside of the stream valleys, the slopes do not feature any significant rock formations or groups of rocks.

The slopes have relatively uneven and varied inclines. The maximum average incline of the eastern slope, known as Sněžné strže, does not exceed 40° over a 50-metre stretch. Additionally, the eastern slope is an area where snow avalanches may occur during periods of snow cover. The snow layer can persist until almost June. Besides the marked tourist trails, the slopes are covered with a network of unmarked roads and paths.

The eastern and southeastern slopes are traversed by the I/44 road connecting Šumperk and Jeseník. This road was originally laid out in the 19th century to connect with the then-developing tourist base at Červenohorské sedlo pass, and later in the 20th century, it was paved. To ease the incline of the slope, two road loops were built at elevations of 815 and 870 metres. From this road on the slopes of Červená hora, there are views towards many nearby peaks, including Jeřáb, Velký Klín, Velký Klín–JZ, and Velký Klínovec.

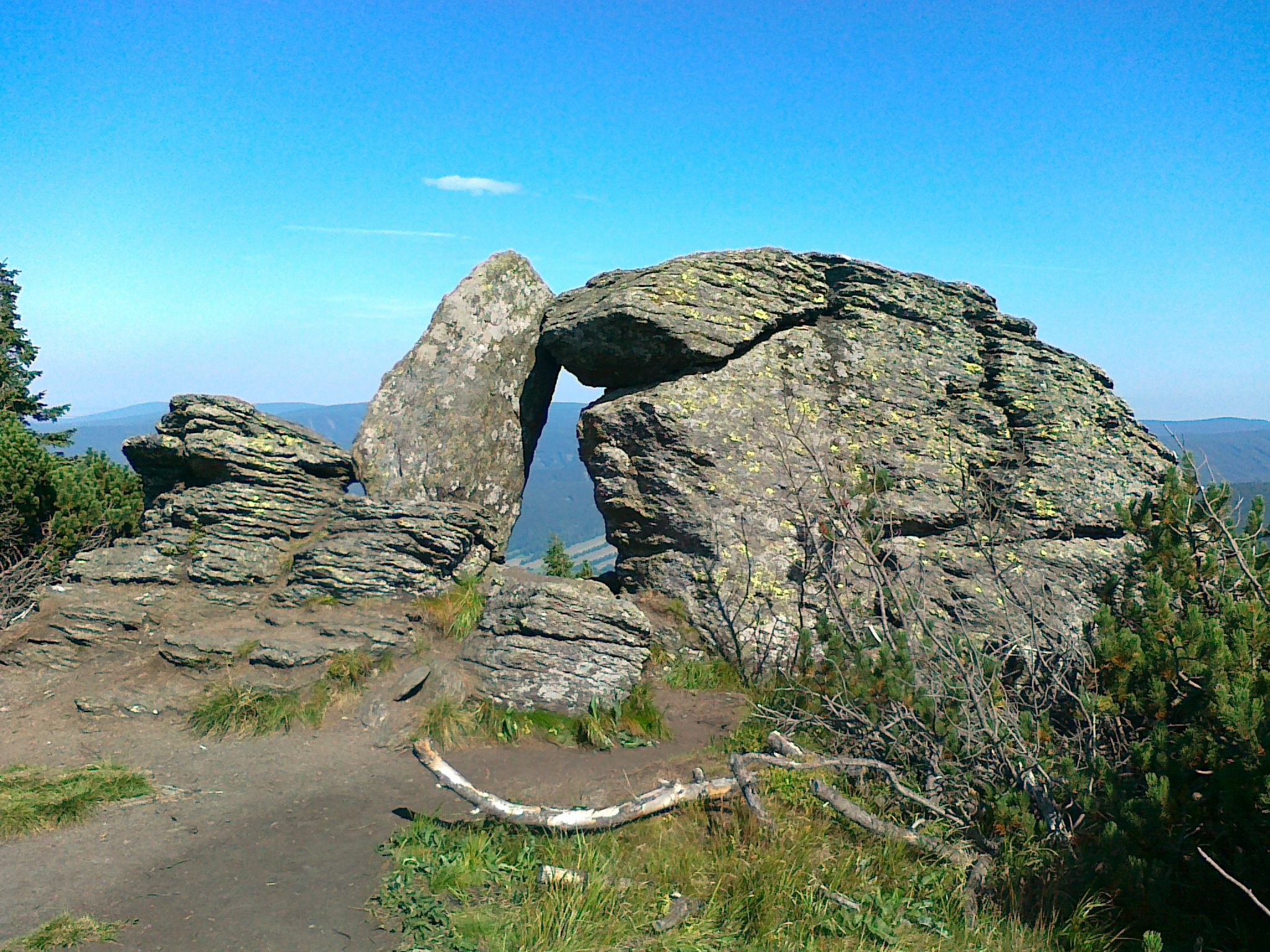
Natural window called Kamenné okno on the slope of Červená hora–S

A notable feature on the mountain is the natural window called Kamenné okno, located about 600 metres north of the main summit.

=== Main summit ===
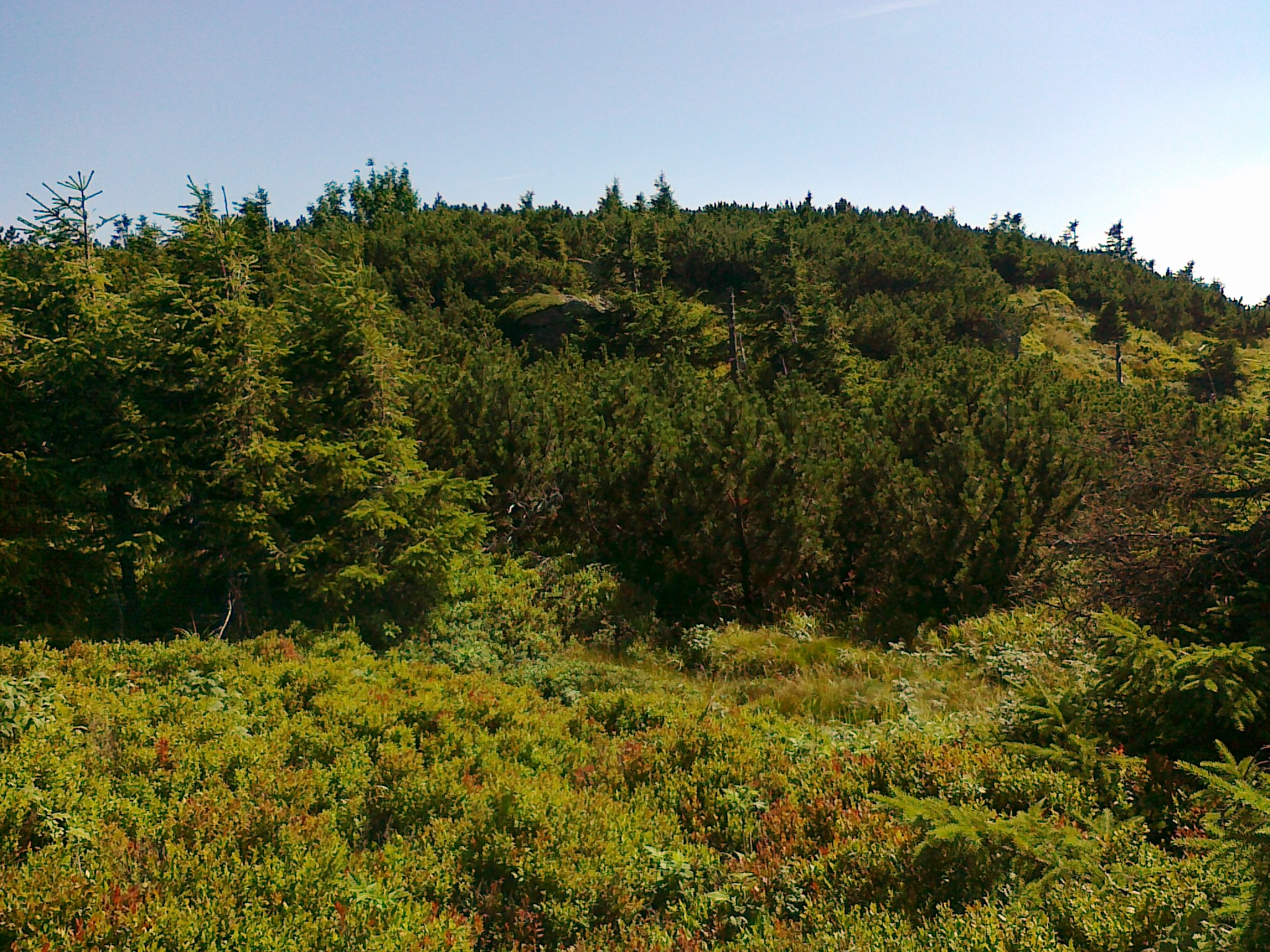
View at the summit of Červená hora

The main summit of Červená hora is not accessible by any marked tourist trail. The summit is difficult to reach, situated in a small clearing surrounded by dense dwarf mountain pine and a few scattered spruce trees. Due to the height of the dwarf pines, the summit offers only limited views. However, some of the visible peaks include Dlouhé stráně, Mravenečník, Medvědí hora, Malý Děd, Praděd, Petrovy kameny, Vysoká hole, and Velký Klínovec. At the summit, there is a triangulation station, marked on geodetic maps with the number 33, at an elevation of 1,332.61 metres above sea level, and the geographical coordinates of 50°08′39.27″N 17°08′09.46″E. Near this station, there is a steel post with a warning sign indicating that damaging the station is punishable by law.

To reach the summit, one must depart from the yellow tourist trail. A difficult, unmarked, short path of about 100 metres leads through the dense dwarf pine to the summit.

=== Secondary summits ===
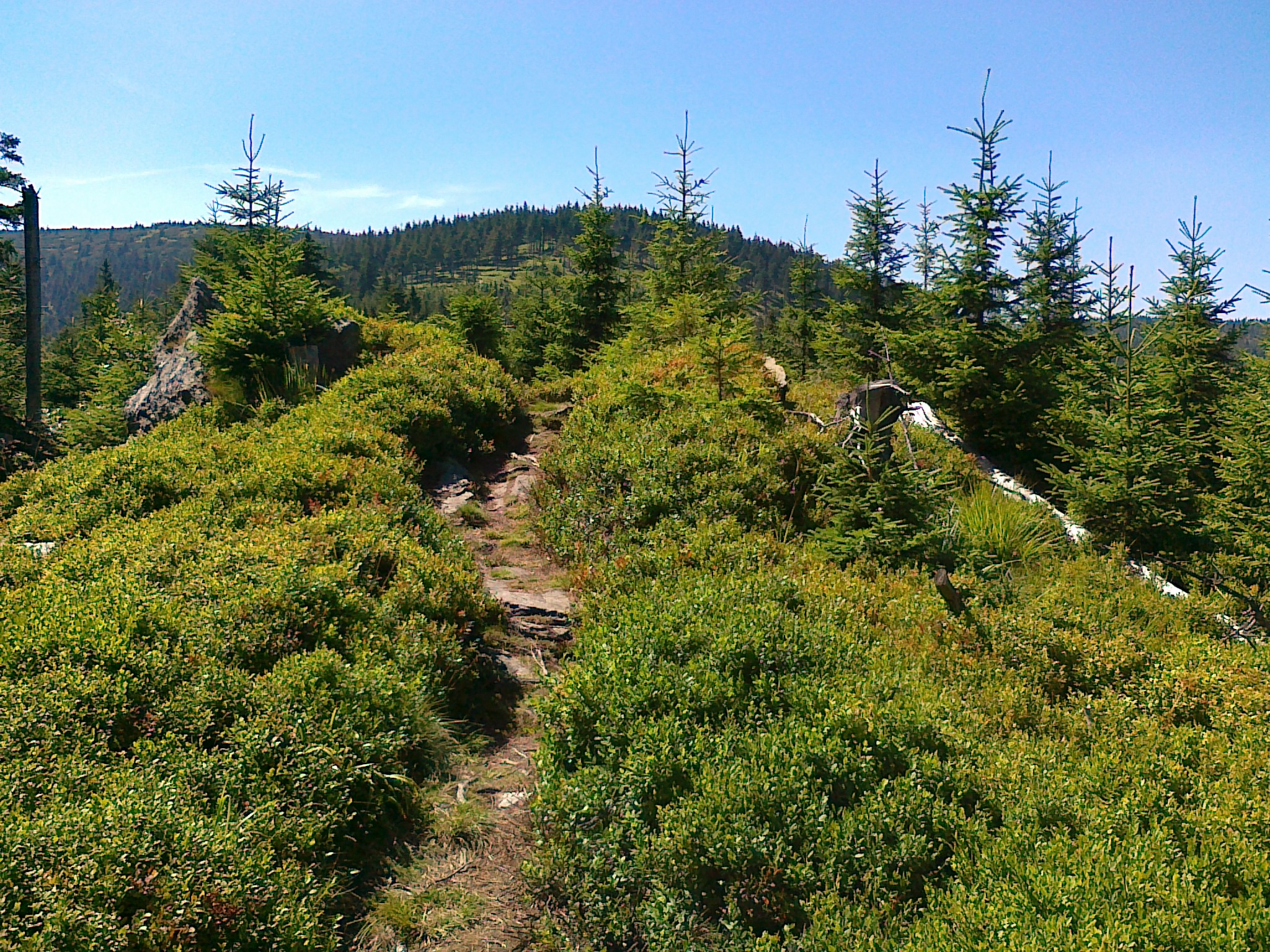
View from the summit of Točník to the secondary summit of Červená hora–S

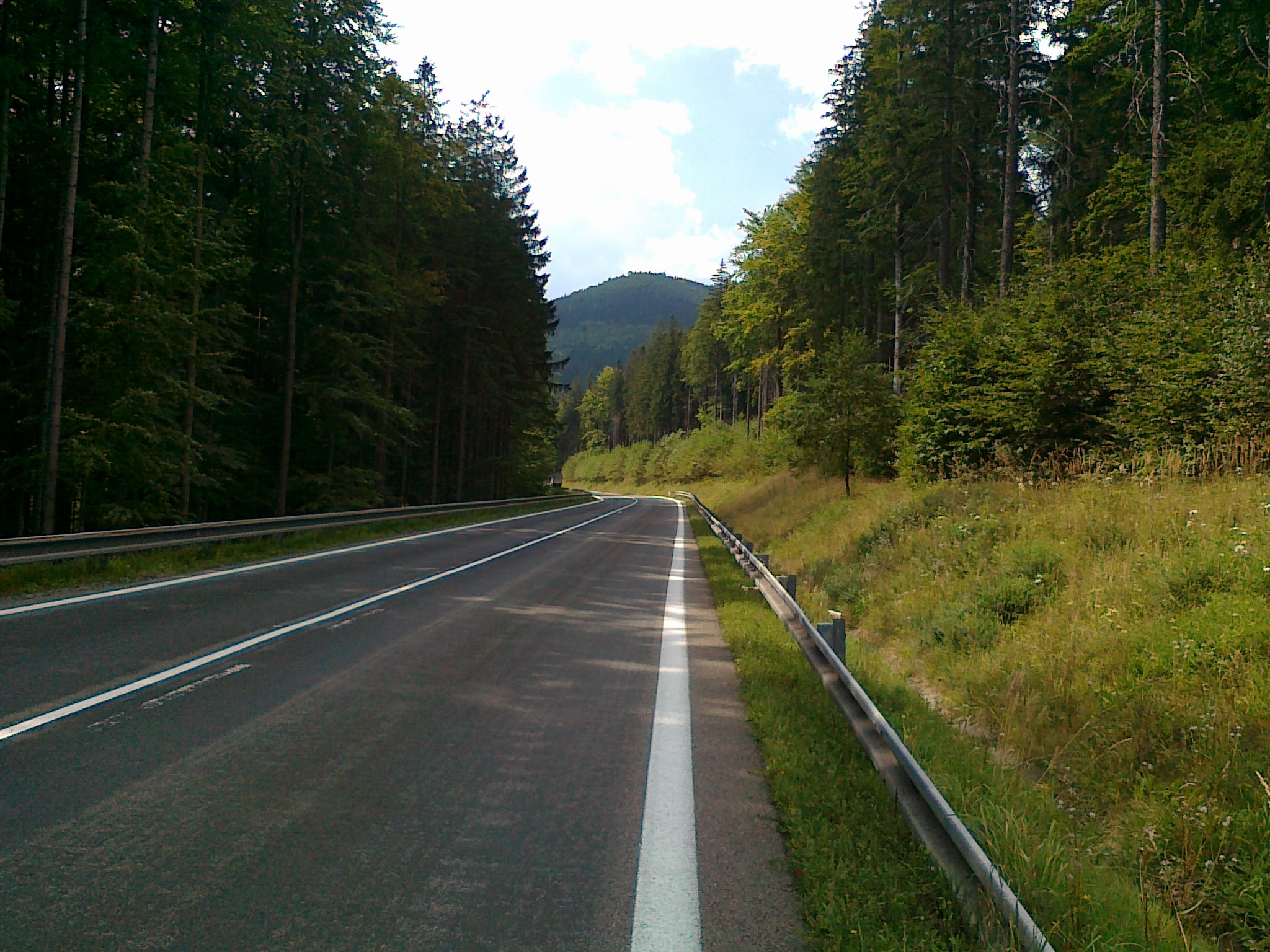
View from the I/44 road to the summit of Červená hora–V

Červená hora is a mountain with four peaks. In addition to the main summit, there are three lower secondary summits within the massif:

Secondary summits of Červená hora
Number	Summit	Elevation (metres above sea level)	Distance from main summit (metres)	Coordinates
1	Červená hora–S	1,311	500 m to the north	50°08′53.0″N 17°08′08.9″E
2	Červená hora–V	1,109	870 m to the east	50°08′36.5″N 17°08′53.7″E
3	Červená hora–JV	1,105	1,950 m to the southeast	50°07′43.9″N 17°08′56.6″E

=== Geology ===
Geologically, Červená hora belongs to the Keprník Dome formation and is composed of various metamorphic rocks, including phyllites (biotite, chlorite, muscovite), phyllonites, mica schists (staurolite, andalusite, garnet, sillimanite), greenstone schists, gneisses, and quartzites. Additionally, the mountain features sedimentary rocks, mainly limestones, and igneous rocks, particularly meta-granodiorites and meta-dacites.

=== Waters ===
Červená hora summit

Climate chart (precipitation, max. and min. temperature)
J	F	M	A	M	J	J	A	S	O	N	D
37 −5 −10	36 −4 −9	52 1 −6	65 7 −2	113 12 3	113 14 6	123 17 8	98 17 8	70 12 4	42 8 0	49 1 −4	39 −4 −8
- █ Average max. and min. temperatures in °C
- █ Precipitation totals in mm
- Source: Climate of Červená hora. meteoblue.com
Imperial conversion
J	F	M	A	M	J	J	A	S	O	N	D
1.5 23 14	1.4 25 16	2 34 21	2.6 45 28	4.4 54 37	4.4 57 43	4.8 63 46	3.9 63 46	2.8 54 39	1.7 46 32	1.9 34 25	1.5 25 18
- █ Average max. and min. temperatures in °F
- █ Precipitation totals in inches

Červená hora lies along the European watershed, with its northern, eastern, and northeastern slopes draining into the Baltic Sea basin (Oder river basin), while its western, southwestern, and southern slopes drain into the Black Sea basin (Danube river basin). The eastern slopes are the source of four streams: Hluboký potok, Páteční potok, Černý potok, and Sněžný potok, while the southern slope hosts the source of Divoký potok.

Located approximately 200 metres northwest of the summit on the western slope at an elevation of 1,274 metres is the Vřesová studánka spring, which is housed within a small chapel. Above the spring are the remnants of a former tourist shelter and a church that was destroyed by a lightning strike. Today, a metal cross with a relief in its base marks the site. Additionally, about 530 metres southeast of the summit at an elevation of 1,150 metres lies another spring, known as Studánka Sněžná dolina.

Several streams on the slopes of Červená hora feature waterfalls. About 1.3 kilometres south of the summit, at an elevation of approximately 950 metres, an unnamed stream forms the Šindelné waterfalls, which are about 3 metres high. Another waterfall, called Páteční vodopád, is located about 1.6 kilometres east of the summit on the Páteční potok stream, consisting of four drops with respective heights of 2, 2, 3, and 5 metres.

== Nature preservation ==
The entire Červená hora mountain is located within the Jeseníky Protected Landscape Area, which was established to protect its unique rock formations, soil, plant life, and rare animal species. The eastern slopes of the mountain host the Sněžná kotlina Nature Reserve.

=== Sněžná kotlina Nature Reserve ===
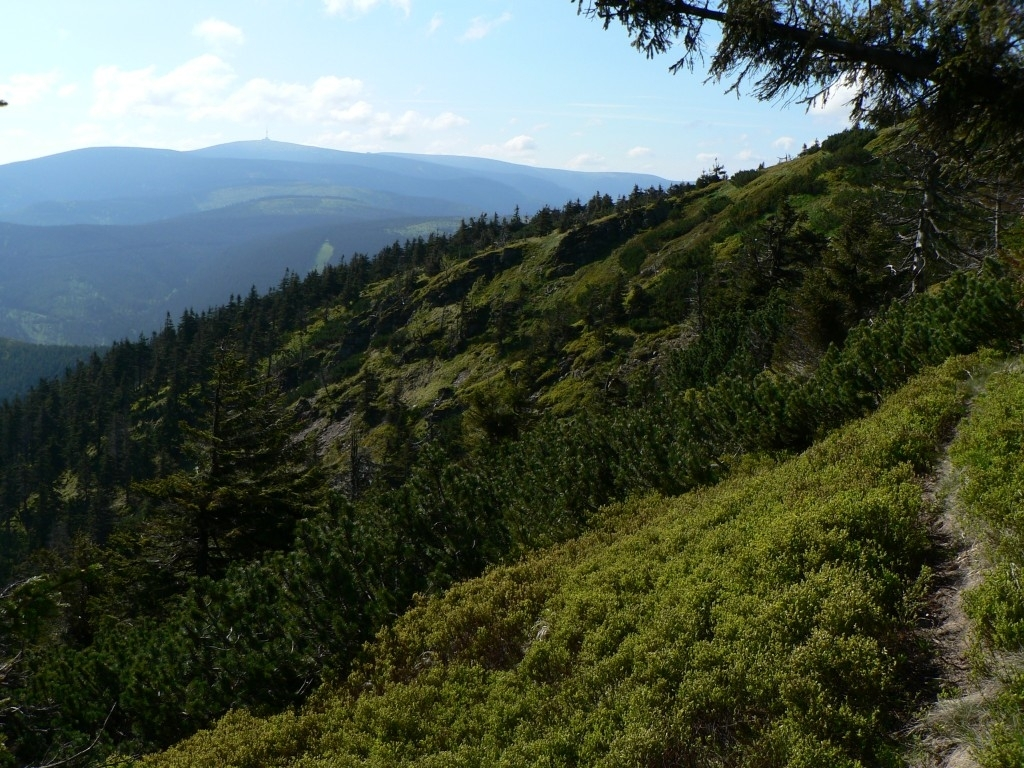
View at the Sněžná kotlina Nature Reserve

The Sněžná kotlina Nature Reserve was established in 1998 and covers an area of approximately 108 hectares at elevations ranging from 980 to 1,320 metres above sea level. This reserve is situated on a steep slope that is subject to various natural forces such as frost, snow accumulation with potential avalanches, erosion, and historical glacial activity during the Pleistocene era, which left behind a cirque. To prevent avalanches, dwarf pines were artificially planted in the area. The reserve is a valuable botanical site with rare plant species, some of which are unique and endangered, including the spotted gentian, hard-fern, Viola lutea subsp. sudetica, alpine yellow-violet, narcissus anemone, Diphasiastrum, garden monkshood, and Empetrum nigrum subsp. hermaphroditum.

Tourists are not permitted within the reserve, and there are no marked trails leading into it. However, there are paths near the Eva and Černohorka huts, but using them is discouraged to protect the delicate ecosystem.

== Tourism ==
=== Hiking trails ===
The Czech Tourist Club has marked four hiking trails on and around Červená hora:

Červenohorské sedlo – Červená hora – Vřesová studánka – Sedlo pod Keprníkem pass – Keprník–JV – Trojmezí – Keprník – Sedlo pod Keprníkem pass – Šerák mountain – Mračná hora – Černava – Ramzová

Kouty nad Desnou – Suchá hora – Šindelná hora–JZ – Šindelná hora – Červená hora – Vřesová studánka – Kamenné okno – Točník – Bělá pod Pradědem

Filipovice – Jeřáb – Mariin pramen spring – Velký Klín – Červenohorské sedlo pass – Kouty nad Desnou – Hučivá Desná stream valley – Sedlo pod Vřesovkou pass – Kamenné okno – Červená hora – Bílý sloup

Along the red tourist trail, there is an educational path called NS S Koprníčkem na výlet Keprnickými horami. This trail runs from Červenohorské sedlo to Ramzová and features 13 observation points.

=== Cycling routes ===
Two cycling routes also pass near the mountain:

Přemyslov – Černá stráň – Hučivá Desná stream valley – Červená hora – Šindelná hora – Suchá hora – Kouty nad Desnou – Hřbety – Nad Petrovkou – Petrovka

V Mlýnkách – Nad Výrovkou – Točník – Filipovice – Jeřáb – Mariin pramen spring – Velký Klín – Pod Velkým Klínem

There is also a challenging uphill cycling route from Bělá pod Pradědem to Červenohorské sedlo along road no. 44, which is 8.9 km long with an elevation gain of 474 metres and an average gradient of 5.4%, including two switchbacks.

=== Skiing routes ===
During snowy periods, the area around Červená hora offers cross-country skiing trails, including a route along the red hiking trail known as Jesenická magistrála:

Červenohorské sedlo – Červená hora – Šindelná hora – Šindelná hora-JZ – Suchá hora – Kouty nad Desnou

There are also downhill skiing routes on the slopes of the mountain, which are part of the Ski areál Červenohorské sedlo:

Main downhill ski trails with lifts from Červená hora
Number	Trail and name	Trail length (metres)	Elevation gain (metres)	Lift type	Lift length (metres)
1	4	450	100	T-bar	500 and 180
2	5	440	500	T-bar	400
