= Petříkov (Ostružná) =

- Village
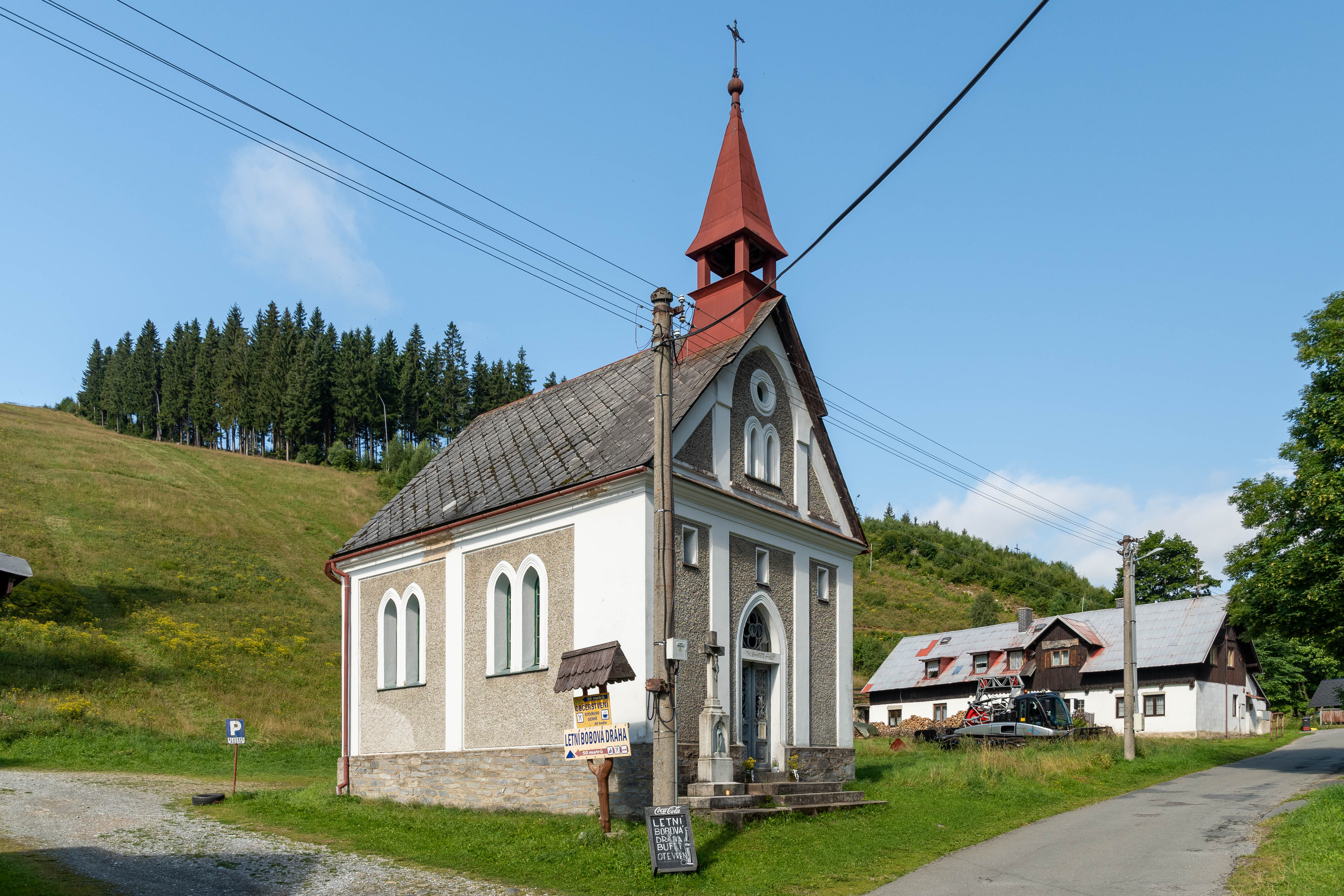
- Chapel of Saint Lawrence

- Location in the Czech Republic
- Coordinates: 50°12′14″N 17°2′31″E
- Country: Czech Republic
- Region: Olomouc
- District: Jeseník
- Municipality: Ostružná
- Founded: 1617

Area
  - Total: 6.23 km^{2} (2.41 sq mi)
- Elevation: 780 m (2,560 ft)

Population (2021)
  - Total: 28
  - Density: 4.5/km^{2} (12/sq mi)
- Time zone: UTC+1 (CET)
  - Summer (DST): UTC+2 (CEST)
- Postal code: 788 26

Petříkov (German: Peterswald) is a village and administrative part of Ostružná in the Olomouc Region of the Czech Republic. It has about 30 inhabitants.

== Geography ==
Petříkov is located in the Hrubý Jeseník mountains, 15 kilometres (9 mi) from the town of Jeseník.

== History ==
Petříkov was founded in 1617 by Hanuš Petřvaldský and was originally known as Peterswald (meaning "Peter's Forest"). It has a chapel dedicated to St. Lawrence, built in 1909.

== Sport ==
Petříkov is known for a ski resort. The ski resort also has a summer bobsled run.
