= Homole =

Homole may refer to:

== Czech Republic ==
- Homole (České Budějovice District), a municipality and village in the South Bohemian Region
- Homole, former name of Homole u Panny, a municipality and village in the Ústí nad Labem Region
- Homole, a village and part of Borovnice (Rychnov nad Kněžnou District) in the Hradec Králové Region, a pilgrimage site
- Homole, a village and part of Drhovy in the Central Bohemian Region
- Homole, mountain in the Hrubý Jeseník range

== Greece ==
- Homolium or Homole, a town of ancient Thessaly

== Poland ==
- Homole, a castle in Lower Silesian Voivodeship
