= Petrov nad Desnou =

- Municipality
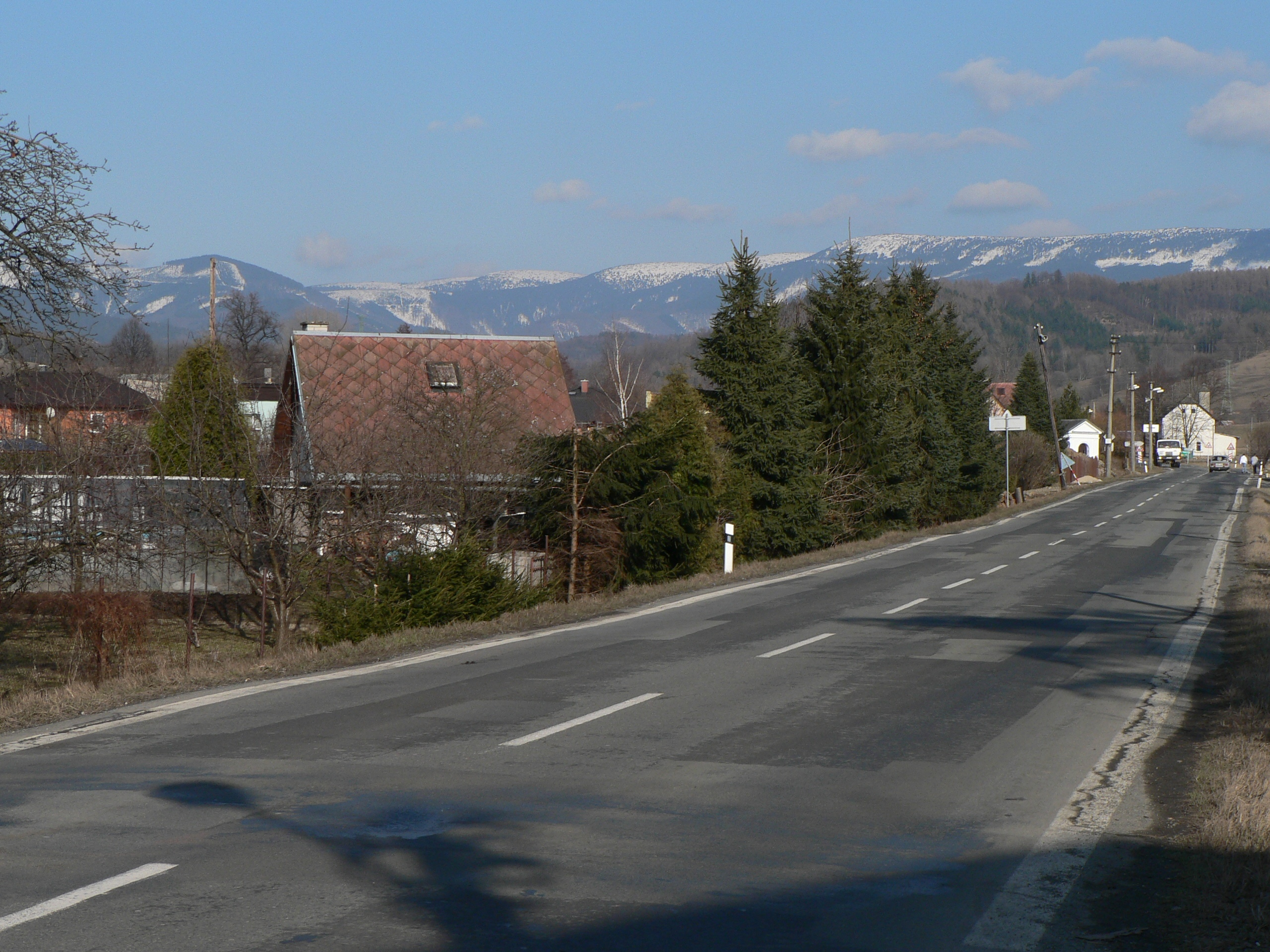
- Main road; Hrubý Jeseník in the background

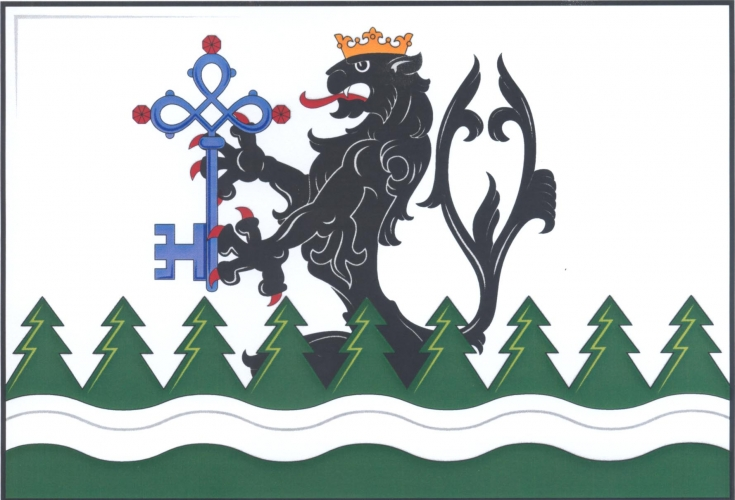
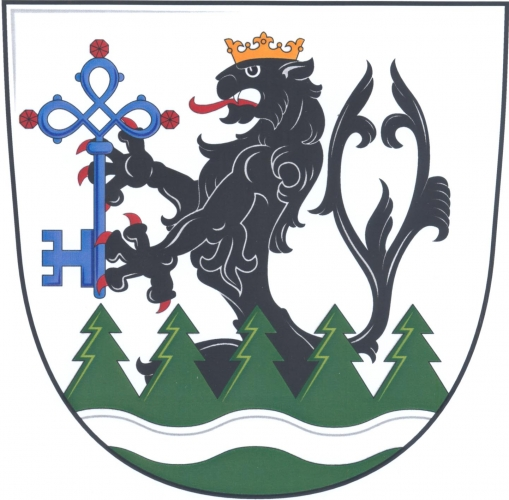
- Flag Coat of arms

- Location in the Czech Republic
- Coordinates: 50°0′20″N 17°2′40″E
- Country: Czech Republic
- Region: Olomouc
- District: Šumperk
- First mentioned: 1354

Area
  - Total: 12.09 km^{2} (4.67 sq mi)
- Elevation: 365 m (1,198 ft)

Population (2026-01-01)
  - Total: 1,226
  - Density: 101.4/km^{2} (262.6/sq mi)
- Time zone: UTC+1 (CET)
  - Summer (DST): UTC+2 (CEST)
- Postal codes: 788 14, 788 16
- Website: www.petrovnaddesnou.cz

Petrov nad Desnou (until 1955 Petrovice nad Desnou; German: Petersdorf an der Tess) is a municipality and village in Šumperk District in the Olomouc Region of the Czech Republic. It has about 1,200 inhabitants.

== Administrative division ==
Petrov nad Desnou consists of two municipal parts (in brackets population according to the 2021 census):

- Petrov nad Desnou (1,074)
- Terezín (121)

== Geography ==
Petrov nad Desnou is located about 6 kilometres (4 mi) northeast of Šumperk and 48 km (30 mi) north of Olomouc. It lies in the Hanušovice Highlands. The highest point is the hill Petrovský vrch at 778 m (2,552 ft) above sea level. The municipality is situated at the confluence of the Desná and Merta rivers.

== History ==
The first written mention of Petrov nad Desnou is from 1354. From 1980 to 2009, it was a municipal part of Sobotín. On 1 January 2010, Petrov nad Desnou became a separate municipality.

== Demographics ==
Historical population

Year	Pop.	±%
1869	1,795	—
1880	1,913	+6.6%
1890	1,793	−6.3%
1900	1,635	−8.8%
1910	1,744	+6.7%

Year	Pop.	±%
1921	1,594	−8.6%
1930	1,777	+11.5%
1950	1,161	−34.7%
1961	1,400	+20.6%
1970	1,308	−6.6%

Year	Pop.	±%
1980	1,211	−7.4%
1991	1,271	+5.0%
2001	1,261	−0.8%
2011	1,195	−5.2%
2021	1,195	+0.0%

Source: Censuses

== Transport ==
The I/11 road (the section from Šumperk to Ostrava) runs through the municipality.

Petrov nad Desnou is located on the railway line Nezamyslice–Kouty nad Desnou via Olomouc.

== Sights ==
Chapel of Saint Roch

There are no protected cultural monuments in the municipality.

The main cultural landmark is the Chapel of Saint Roch. It was built in the late Neoclassical style in 1850.
