= Dlouhé stráně =

Mountain in the Czech Republic

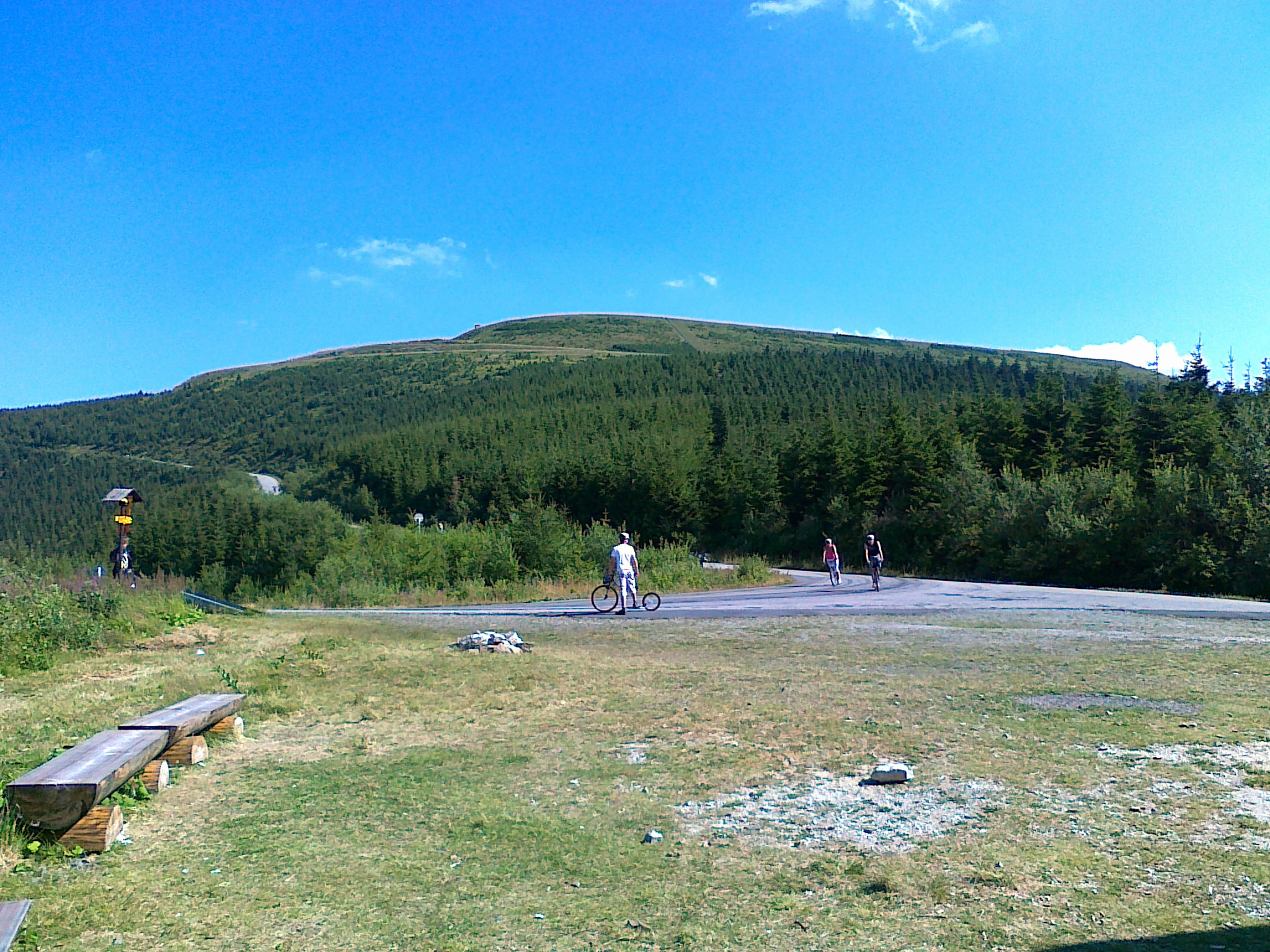
- View of the peak slope of the Dlouhé stráně mountain

Highest point
- Elevation: 1,354 m (4,442 ft)
- Prominence: 170 m (560 ft)
- Isolation: 4 km (2.5 mi)
- Coordinates: 50°4′17″N 17°9′24″E

Geography
- Location within Czech Republic
- Location: Loučná nad Desnou, Olomouc Region
- Parent range: Hrubý Jeseník

Dlouhé stráně (German: Lange Lenth) is a mountain in the Hrubý Jeseník mountain range in the Czech Republic. It has an elevation of 1,354 m (4,442 ft) above sea level. It is located in the municipality of Loučná nad Desnou. Its summit was cut off to build the upper reservoir for the Dlouhé stráně Hydro Power Plant. The mountain is easily recognizable from a distance due to the leveled shape of its summit plateau.

== History ==
Until 1978, the summit area of Dlouhé stráně had a dome-shaped appearance, with the peak at an elevation of 1,350.3 m above sea level. At that time, the government of Czechoslovakia decided to initiate the construction of the upper reservoir for the Dlouhé stráně Hydro Power Plant, which led to a significant alteration of the mountain's appearance. The upper reservoir was built by "cutting off" the summit of the mountain and using the excavated material to expand the base of the reservoir.

== Description ==
=== Location ===
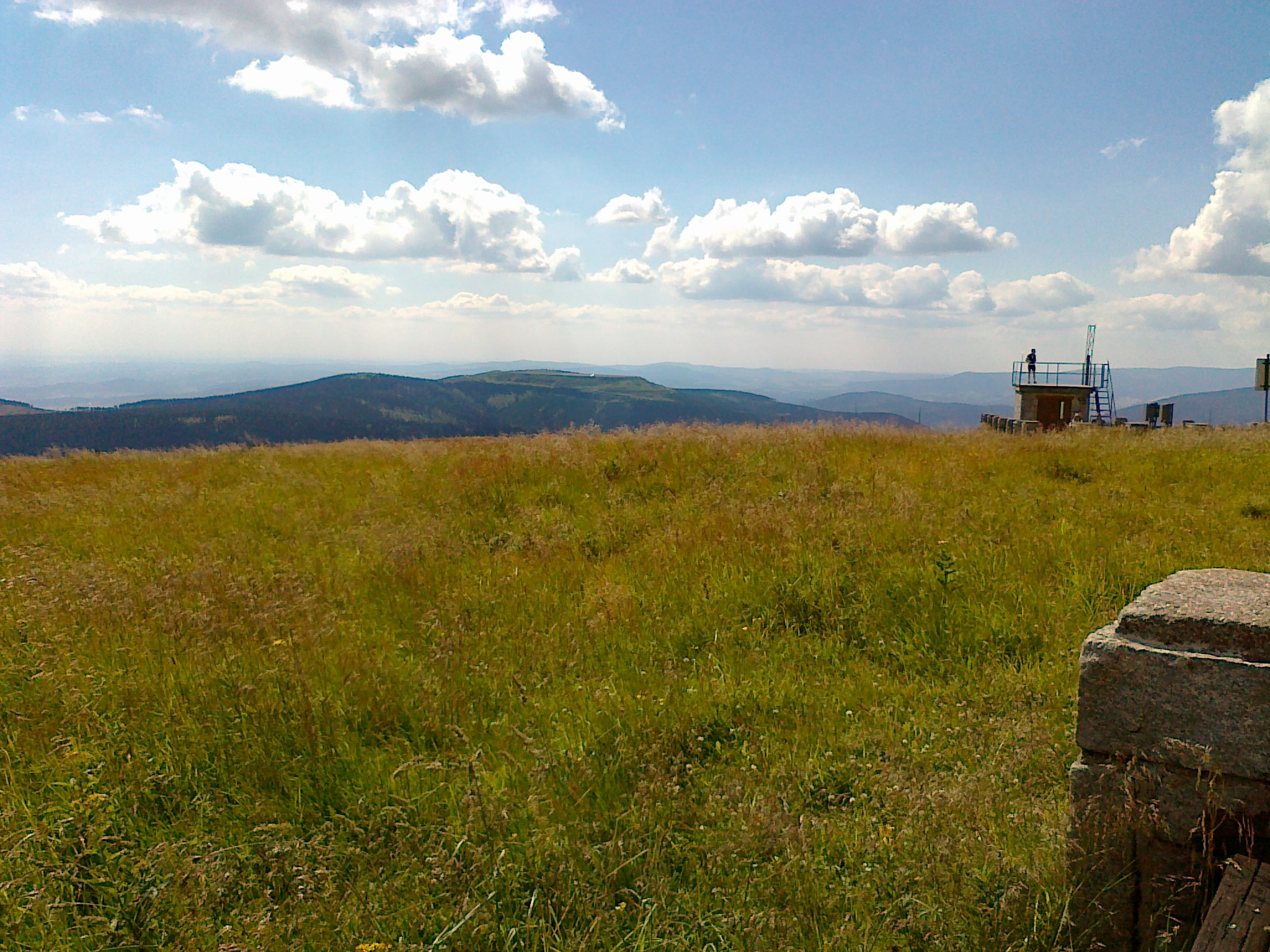
View from the summit of Praděd mountain towards the mountains: Vřesník, Dlouhé stráně (with the peak of Mravenečník above it), Kamenec (1), and Medvědí hora (with the barely visible summit of Ucháč)

Dlouhé stráně is situated in the central-western part of the Hrubý Jeseník mountain range, specifically in the northern-western area called the Praděd Mountains. It is located on an arc-shaped side ridge that extends from Hubertka mountain to the Vlčí sedlo pass, being the highest mountain on this ridge. Dlouhé stráně is easily recognizable from a distance due to the leveled shape of its summit plateau, which has been adapted into a water reservoir and resembles the shape of a trapezoid. Additionally, the mountain stands out as the middle peak among three summits (Vřesník – Dlouhé stráně – Mravenečník), all of nearly the same height. The mountain is also clearly visible from the road surrounding the summit area of Praděd, where it emerges to the right of the neighboring Vřesník mountain. It is easily noticeable and locatable from the nearby mentioned peaks of Mravenečník and Vřesník, as well as from the main ridge peaks of Praděd mountain: Vysoká hole, Kamzičník, Velký Máj, Jelení hřbet, Břidličná hora and Pecný.

The mountain is bordered by:

- the northeast by a pass at 1,093 m above sea level towards the Tupý vrch peak;
- the east by the valley of the Jezerná stream;
- the southeast by the Pláň pass at 1,311 m above sea level;
- the south by the valley of the Studený potok (2) (Note: Indexed designation as opposed to the Studený stream (1) in the same range, flowing between the slopes of the Malý Děd and Velký Jezerník mountains.) stream (Czech: Švagrovské údolí) and a pass at 743 m above sea level towards the Nad Myslivnou peak;
- the southwest by the valley of the Kamenitý potok stream;
- the west by a pass at 1,302 m above sea level towards the Mravenečník peak;
- the northwest by the valley of the Borový potok stream.

In the vicinity of the mountain are the following peaks:

- to the west, Mravenečník;
- to the northwest, Kamenec (1), (Note: Indexed designation to distinguish it from two other peaks in the same range with the same name: Kamenec (2), located 3.3 km southeast of the Skřítek Pass, and Kamenec (3), located 1.7 km east of the village Bělá pod Pradědem.) Medvědí hora, and Rysí skála;
- to the northeast, Tupý vrch;
- to the southeast, Malá Jezerná and Vřesník;
- to the south, Jestřábí vrch;
- to the southwest, Jestřábí vrch–JZ, Nad Myslivnou, and Kozí hřbet.

=== Slopes ===
The mountain has four main slopes: northwestern, northern, northeastern and southwestern. These slopes are known by specific names: Kamenná stráň, Buková hora, V bucích, and U čtyř mostků.

All types of forestation can be found here: spruce forest, mixed forest, (Note: The forest stand of the entire Jeseníky Protected Landscape Area includes: European spruce 84%, European beech 10%, European larch 1.5%, sycamore maple 1.1%, birch 1%, common alder 0.8%, dwarf mountain pine 0.4%, grey alder 0.3%, (European silver fir, European ash, and linden) 0.2%, Scotch pine 0.1%, and others (Pinus mugo, oak, hornbeam, Norway maple, elm, rowan, green alder, aspen, poplar, and goat willow) 0.2%.) and deciduous forest, with variations depending on the location and orientation of the slope. The northwestern slope is forested with spruce. The northern and northeastern slopes are forested with spruce, gradually transitioning to mixed forests as the elevation decreases, with the northern slope even transitioning to deciduous forest. The upper parts of the southwestern slope are forested with spruce, transitioning to mixed forest (Kamenná stráň, Buková hora, V bucích, and U čtyř mostků) and deciduous forest (Buková hora and V bucích) as the elevation decreases. The slopes feature significant glades and several hundred-meter-long slope clearings, especially on the southwestern slope (Kamenná stráň and Buková hora). Additionally, there is a larger rock formation on the Kamenná stráň slope at an elevation of approximately 1,065 m. Rock formations also occur on the northern slope, and on the northeastern slope near the tourist crossroads (Czech: Horní nádrž PVE DS (závora)), where there is a group of rocks at an elevation of 1,260 m according to the information board.

The slopes have relatively varied and uneven gradients, ranging from 13° (northwestern and southwestern slopes) to 24° (northeastern slope). The average gradient of all the mountain slopes is about 17°. The maximum average gradient on the northeast slope near the rock group on a 50-meter section does not exceed 50°. The slopes are covered with a network of roads with designated cycling routes and a few generally unmarked paths.

=== Summit ===
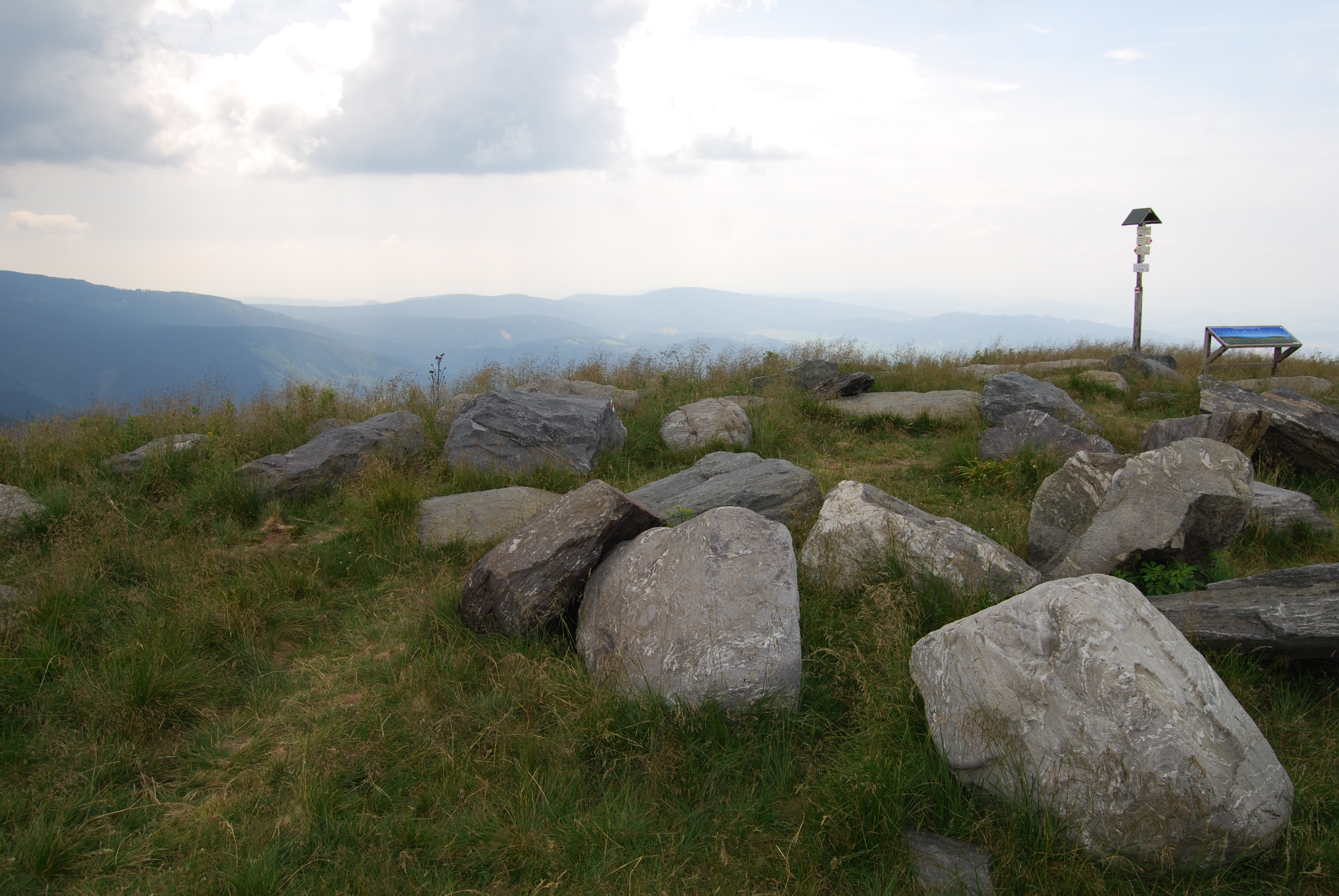
Viewpoint on the summit of Dlouhé stráně

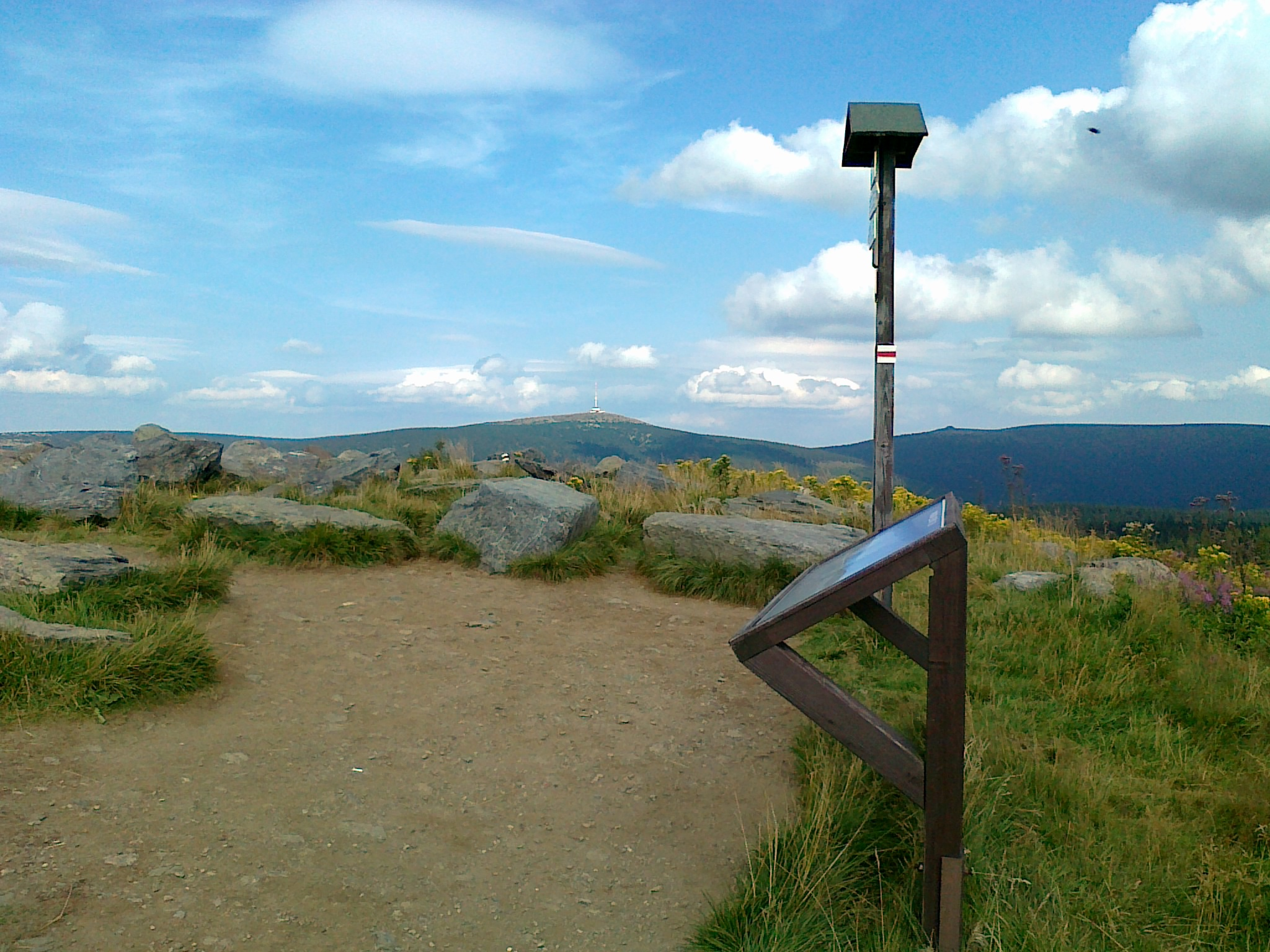
View from the summit of Dlouhé stráně towards the peaks: Praděd, Petrovy kameny, and Vysoká hole

The summit area is accessible via a red tourist trail from the settlement of Kouty nad Desnou. At the summit, there is a prominent viewpoint situated near the southern semicircle of the reservoir, with notable rock blocks and a tourist stop named Dlouhé stráně (vyhl.) marked at 1,353 m on the informational board. Near this point, there is an informational display showing visible peaks and towns to the south. The summit does not have a triangulation station. According to a detailed map from the State Administration of Land Surveying and Cadastre, the highest point of the mountain is on one of the rock blocks at an elevation of 1,353.8 m above sea level, with geographical coordinates 50°04′16.54″N 17°09′24.34″E. The summit area is covered, besides the mentioned dozens of rock blocks, with alpine meadows.

The upper reservoir of the Dlouhé stráně Hydro Power Plant, located near the summit, has an irregular oval shape in the horizontal projection, approximately 710 m long and 240 m wide. The reservoir depth is around 26 m. Along the top edge of the reservoir, protective railings are installed. In the vertical projection (cross-section), the reservoir has a trapezoidal shape.

The top edge of the reservoir is at an elevation of 1,350 m above sea level. Around the reservoir, there are asphalt roads (an upper one for pedestrians) and 50 m below (a lower one for bicycles), from which landscapes of the surrounding mountains can be seen. Near the northern semicircle of the reservoir, at about 1,335 m above sea level, there is a rectangular asphalt area measuring 70 × 25 m, featuring a small kiosk (fast food) and a scooter rental shop, offering rides down the mountain. This is the longest descent route in Moravia.

=== Geology ===
Geologically, Dlouhé stráně belongs to the unit known as the Desná Dome and is composed of metamorphic rocks, mainly gneisses (biotite, muscovite, chlorite, garnet), phyllonites, and migmatites. During the excavation of rock tunnels, geologists also found paragneisses with amphibolite and pegmatite inclusions in the mountain massif.

=== Waters ===
Dlouhé stráně peak

Climate chart (precipitation, max. and min. temperature)
J	F	M	A	M	J	J	A	S	O	N	D
32 5 −10	36 −4 −9	52 1 −6	65 7 −2	113 12 3	113 14 6	123 17 8	98 17 8	70 12 4	42 8 0	49 1 −4	39 −4 −8
- █ Average max. and min. temperatures in °C
- █ Precipitation totals in mm
- Source: Klimat Horní nádrž Dlouhé Stráně. meteoblue.com
Imperial conversion
J	F	M	A	M	J	J	A	S	O	N	D
1.3 41 14	1.4 25 16	2 34 21	2.6 45 28	4.4 54 37	4.4 57 43	4.8 63 46	3.9 63 46	2.8 54 39	1.7 46 32	1.9 34 25	1.5 25 18
- █ Average max. and min. temperatures in °F
- █ Precipitation totals in inches

The summit and its slopes lie southwest of this boundary, thus belonging to the Black Sea basin, into which waters flow from the Danube's catchment area, including mountain streams from this part of the Hrubý Jeseník mountains (such as the nearby streams Jezerná, Studený potok (2), (Note: Indexed designation as opposed to the Studený stream (1) in the same range, flowing between the slopes of the Malý Děd and Velký Jezerník mountains.) Kamenitý potok, and Borový potok). Several short, unnamed streams flow from the slopes as tributaries of the mentioned streams.

==== Waterfalls ====
The following waterfalls are on the slopes of the mountain:

Waterfalls on the slopes of Dlouhé stráně
Number	Waterfall	Stream	Location	Absolute height (meters above sea level)	Waterfall height (meters)
1	Borové vodopády	Borový potok	base of the northern slope, about 1.9 km north of the peak	790–800	8.3; 2
2	Jezerní vodopády	Jezerná	north-eastern slope, about 1.5 km northeast of the peak	930	3
3	Vodopády pod Tureckými svahy	nameless stream	northern slope, about 1.7 km north of the peak	865–900	35

== Nature protection ==
The entire mountain is within the Jeseníky Protected Landscape Area, established to protect rock formations, landforms, plant life, and rare animal species.

To protect the unique ecosystem, in 2000, a circular educational trail (Czech: Lesní ekostezka Švagrov) was established from the settlement of Švagrov, 4.5 km long, which partly runs at the base of the south-western slope (Švagrovské údolí) on the route:

Švagrov – Švagrovské údolí – Vřesník mountain – Homole mountain – Jestřabí vrch mountain – Švagrov (with 12 observation points along the route)

== Tourism ==
There are no mountain huts or hotels on the peak or slopes.

=== Hiking trails ===
The Czech Tourist Club has marked one hiking trail that traverses the mountain:

- Kouty nad Desnou – Skály mountain – U obrázku pass – Medvědí hora – Kamenec (1) (Note: Indexed designation to distinguish it from two other peaks in the same range with the same name: Kamenec (2), located 3.3 km southeast of the Skřítek Pass, and Kamenec (3), located 1.7 km east of the village Bělá pod Pradědem.) – Mravenečník Mountain – Dlouhé stráně Peak – upper reservoir of the Dlouhé stráně Hydro Power Plant – U Okenní štoly

The upper reservoir can also be accessed via a combined route from Kouty nad Desnou, using a chairlift to the Medvědí hora slope, followed by an asphalt road leading to the reservoir and the summit.

=== Cycling trails ===
Four cycling routes are established around the mountain slopes:

- Loučná nad Desnou – Seč Mountain – Čepel Mountain – Mravenečník Mountain – Medvědí hora – Kamenec (1) – Dlouhé stráně – Velká Jezerná Mountain – Divoká Desná River Valley – Kouty nad Desnou – Černá stráň Mountain – Přemyslovské sedlo Pass – Tři kameny Mountain – Ucháč Mountain – Jelení skok Mountain – Loveč Mountain – Lískovec Mountain – Loučná nad Desnou
- Pod Ztracenými kameny – Pecný Mountain – Špičák Mountain – Jestřábí vrch Mountain – Branka Pass – Homole Mountain – Vřesník Mountain – Dlouhé stráně – Mravenečník Mountain – Kozí hřbet – Čepel Mountain – Uhlířská cesta
- Dlouhé stráně – Vřesník Mountain – Homole Mountain – Vřesník Mountain – Dlouhé stráně – Mravenečník Mountain – Kamenec (1) – Dlouhé stráně Mountain
- Rozsocha – Dlouhé stráně – Kamenitý potok Stream Valley – Sedmidvory (Brněnka)

==== Road climbs ====
The mountain can be accessed via a paved ascent from Kouty nad Desnou to the lower road of Dlouhé stráně (total length: 14.1 km; elevation gain: 739 m; average gradient: 5.2%).

An alternative ascent from Loučná nad Desnou via the red cycling route exists, although it is less frequented due to poor asphalt surface conditions.

=== Ski routes ===
During snow conditions, cross-country ski routes are established along existing cycling paths. There are no designated downhill ski routes on the mountain.
