= Merta (river) =

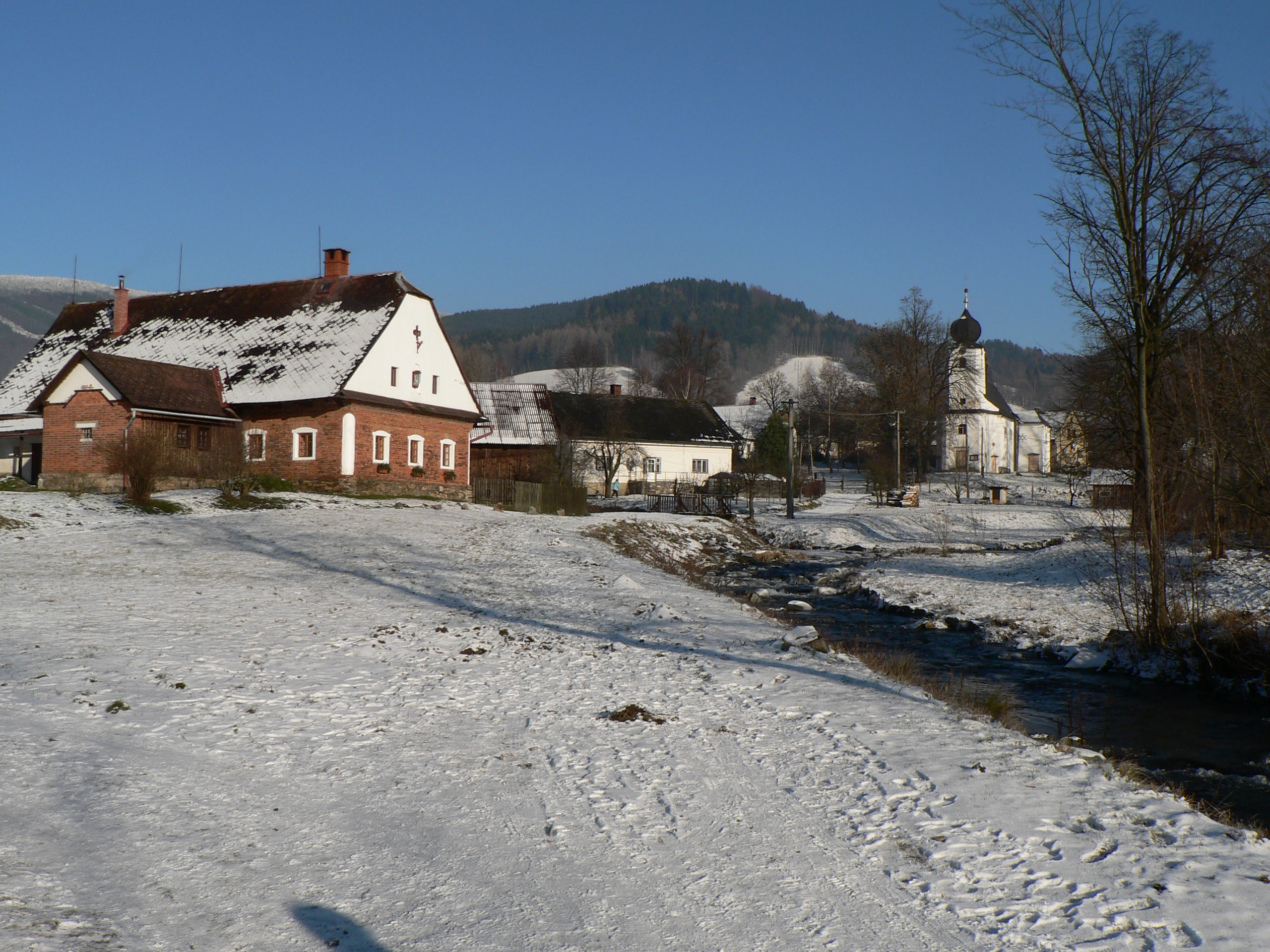
- The Merta in Vernířovice

Location
- Country: Czech Republic
- Region: Olomouc

Physical characteristics
- Source
  - location: Vernířovice, Hrubý Jeseník
  - coordinates: 50°4′2″N 17°10′11″E
  - elevation: 1,260 m (4,130 ft)
- Mouth
  - location: Desná
  - coordinates: 50°0′12″N 17°1′30″E
  - elevation: 355 m (1,165 ft)
- Length: 17.0 km (10.6 mi)
- Basin size: 74.2 km^{2} (28.6 sq mi)
- Discharge
  - average: 1.20 m^{3}/s (42 cu ft/s) near estuary

Basin features
- Progression: Desná→ Morava→ Danube→ Black Sea

The Merta is a river in the Czech Republic, a left tributary of the Desná River. It flows through the Olomouc Region. It is 17.0 km (10.6 mi) long.

== Characteristic ==
The Merta originates in the territory of Vernířovice in the Hrubý Jeseník mountain range at the elevation of 1,260 m (4,130 ft). It flows through the territories of Vernířovice, Velké Losiny and Sobotín to Petrov nad Desnou, where it enters the Desná River at an elevation of 355 m (1,165 ft). It is 17.0 km (10.6 mi) long. Its drainage basin has an area of 74.2 km^{2} (28.6 sq mi). The average discharge at its mouth is 1.20 m3/s.

The longest tributaries of the Merta are:

Tributary	Length (km)	Side
Klepáčovský potok	11.3	left
Kamenitý potok	5.0	right
Ztracený potok	4.6	left

== Fauna ==
The Merta is home to the burbot, alpine bullhead and European bullhead, which are endangered species of fish within the Czech Republic.

== Tourism ==
A tourist destination is the Waterfall of the Merta. It is a four-metre high waterfall, preceded by several smaller cascades and waterfalls.

== See also ==
- List of rivers of the Czech Republic
