= Břidličná hora =

Mountain in the Czech Republic

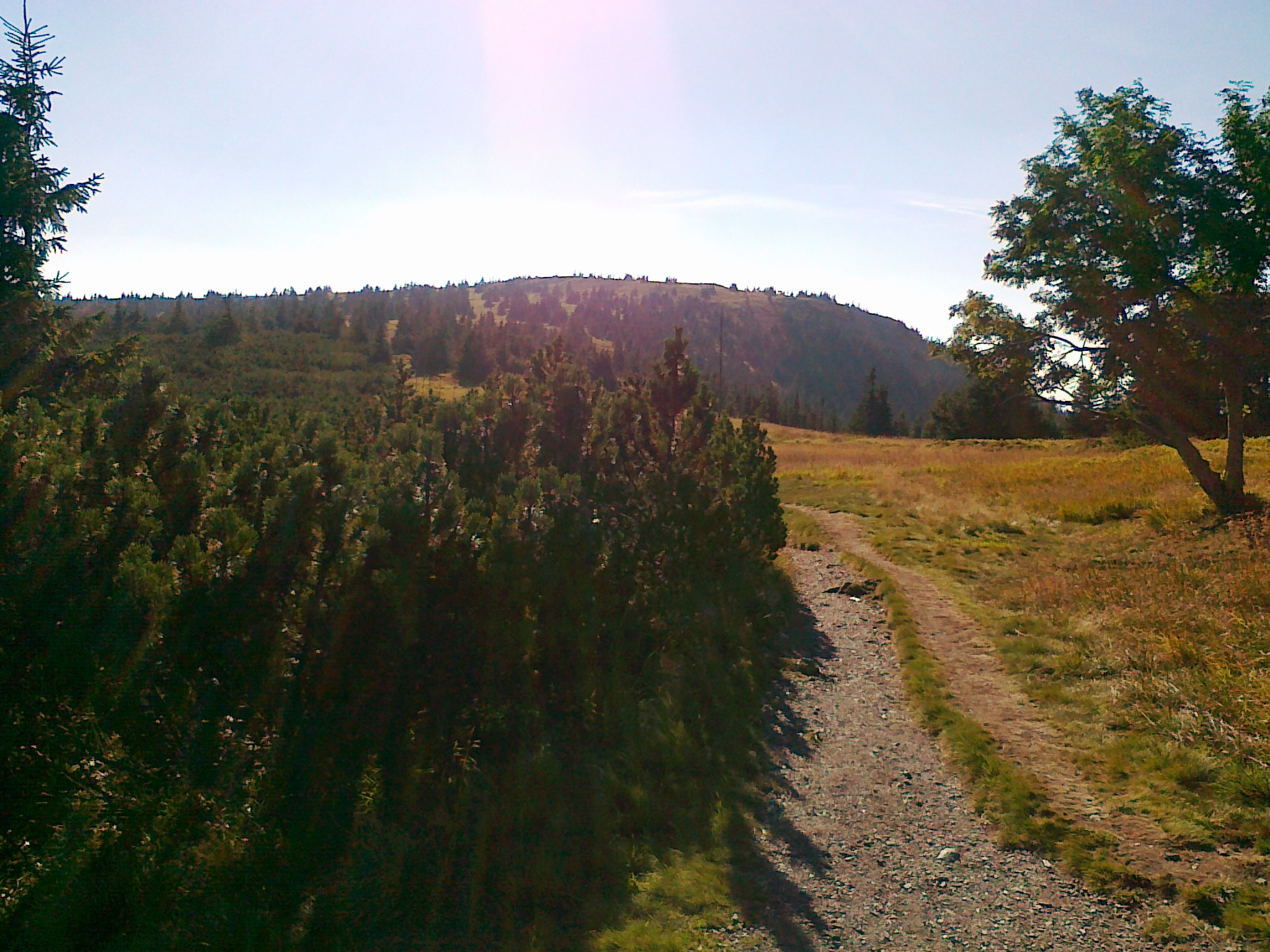
- View from the green hiking trail to Břidličná hora

Highest point
- Elevation: 1,358 m (4,455 ft)
- Prominence: 55 m (180 ft)
- Coordinates: 50°1′59″N 17°11′13″E

Geography
- Location within Czech Republic
- Location: Vernířovice
- Parent range: Hrubý Jeseník

Břidličná hora (German: Schiefer Haide) is a mountain in the Hrubý Jeseník mountain range in the Czech Republic. It has an elevation of 1,358 m (4,455 ft) above sea level. It is located in the municipality of Vernířovice. The peak is approximately 6 km southwest of the summit of Praděd mountain, situated on its main ridge between the summits of Jelení hřbet and Pecný.

== History ==
=== Airplane crash ===
A German military bomber, the Heinkel He 111, of the Luftwaffe, with a crew of likely three members, crashed into the mountain (below the main ridge) on its western slope at an elevation of approximately 1,300 m above sea level during poor weather conditions, probably in 1942 or 1943. The plane completely burned up upon impact. After receiving information about the crash, the German gendarmerie removed the larger pieces of the wreckage, but numerous smaller fragments remained and were later discovered at the site. Despite extensive archival search efforts, it was not possible to identify the crew or the circumstances of their flight.

== Description ==
=== Location ===
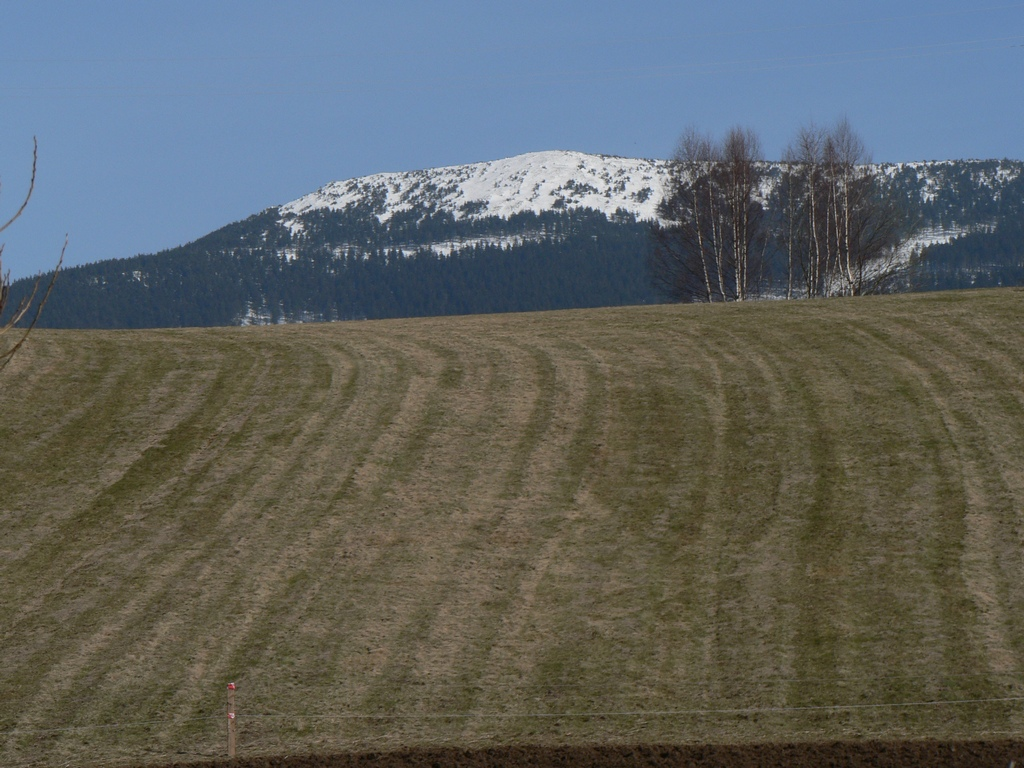
View of Břidličná hora from the village of Vernířovice

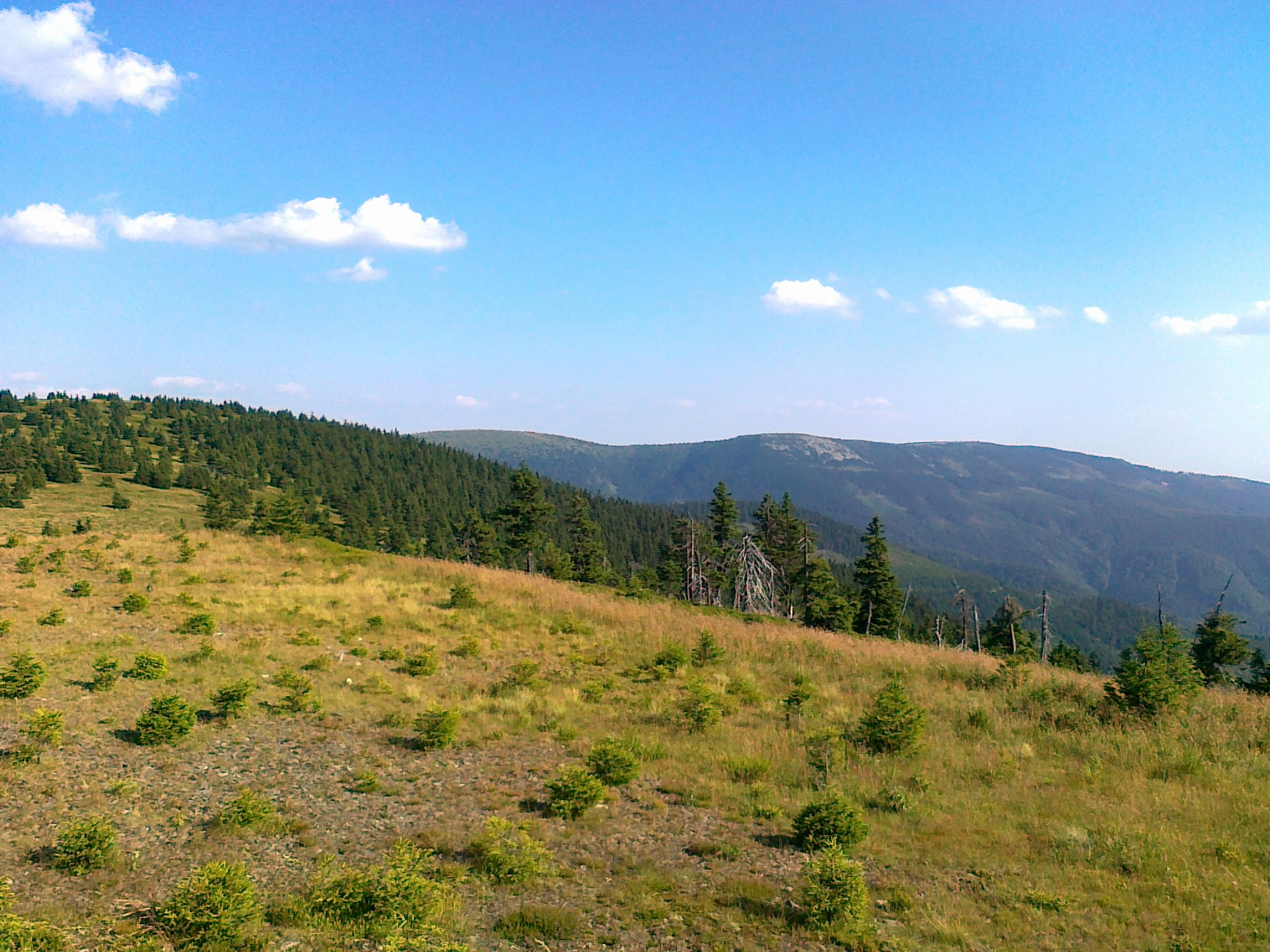
View from the lower road around Dlouhé stráně mountain towards Pláň pass and the peaks: Vřesník, Jelení hřbet, Břidličná hora, and Pecný (below Břidličná hora – Homole)

Břidličná hora is located slightly south of the center of the Hrubý Jeseník mountain range, almost at the center of the Hrubý Jeseník microregion called the Pradědská hornatina. It lies on the main ridge running from the Červenohorské sedlo pass to the Skřítek pass. The mountain, with a slightly domed summit area, is well-visible and recognizable. When looking west at the main ridge, one can see the characteristic "tooth" of the summit rock formation of Petrovy kameny, and further to the right along this ridge, the following peaks: Vysoká hole → Kamzičník → Velký Máj → Jelení hřbet → Břidličná hora. It is visible from two key viewpoints, including the road around the summit of Praděd, where it is marked on an informational panel, and the road around Dlouhé stráně, as well as from the viewpoint on its summit, also marked on an informational panel. The mountain is one of the higher peaks of the Hrubý Jeseník range (the 12th highest peak in the entire range and the 10th highest in the Pradědská hornatina).

The mountain is bordered by:

- to the north: an unremarkable pass at 1,077 m above sea level towards the Čertova stěna peak
- to the northeast: the valley of the Jelení příkop stream
- to the east: a pass at 1,303 m above sea level towards the Jelení hřbet peak
- to the southeast: the valley of a stream called Podolský potok, flowing through Žďárský žleb couloir
- to the south: a pass at 1,313 m above sea level towards the Pecný peak
- to the west: two valleys of unnamed streams, tributaries of the Merta stream
- to the northwest: a pass at 965 m above sea level towards the Špičák peak

Surrounding peaks include:

- to the north: Čertova stěna
- to the northeast: Jelení hřbet
- to the southeast: Jelenka, Ostružná, and Kamenec (2) (Note: The designation is indexed to differentiate it from two other peaks with the same name located in the same range: Kamenec (1), situated 3.8 km east of the village of Loučná nad Desnou, and Kamenec (3), located 1.7 km east of the village of Bělá pod Pradědem)
- to the south: Pecný
- to the southwest: Ztracené kameny, Závora, Svobodínská paseka–V (the last two peaks are in the Hanušovická vrchovina range) and Kočičí skalka
- to the northwest: Jestřábí vrch–JZ and Špičák

=== Slopes ===
The mountain has six main slopes:

- eastern
- southeastern
- southern
- western (U jezírka)
- northwestern
- northern

The slopes are forested mostly with spruce forests from approximately 1,310 to 1,340 m downwards. Above this elevation, alpine tundras and planted dwarf mountain pine groves dominate, especially on the eastern, southeastern, and southern slopes. The other slopes feature various types of forests: spruce, mixed, (Note: The tree stand of the entire Jeseníky Protected Landscape Area includes: Norway spruce (84%), European beech (10%), European larch (1.5%), sycamore maple (1.1%), birch (1%), common alder (0.8%), dwarf mountain pine (0.4%), grey alder (0.3%), European silver fir, European ash, and linden (0.2%), Scotch pine (0.1%), others: Pinus mugo, oak, hornbeam, Norway maple, elm, rowan, green alder, aspen, poplar, and goat willow (0.2%).) and deciduous. On the western, northwestern, and northern slopes, in addition to spruce forests, there are areas of mixed forests and patches of deciduous forests as the elevation decreases. Almost all the slopes are characterized by significant variability in forest height, with the presence of glades, thinned areas, and minor cuttings. On the northern slope, about 370 m northeast of the summit at elevations from 1,180 to 1,235 m above sea level, there are rock formations, while within the mountain itself there are no single larger rock formations. Additionally, on the western, northwestern, and northern slopes, there are significant areas covered with rock debris and boulder fields. The slopes of the mountain, along with those adjacent to the neighboring mountain Jelení hřbet, are among the four main avalanche-prone areas in the High Jeseníky range.

The slopes have relatively uneven and highly varied inclinations. The average slope inclinations range from 3° (southern slope) to 23° (western slope). The average inclination of all the mountain's slopes (weighted arithmetic mean of slope inclinations) is approximately 15°. The maximum average inclination of the northern slope near the rock formations over a 50-meter section does not exceed 45°. The slopes are covered with a network of roads and generally unmarked paths and trails. When traversing them, it is recommended to use detailed maps due to the complexity of their routes, forest cover, and orientation in the terrain.

=== Main summit ===
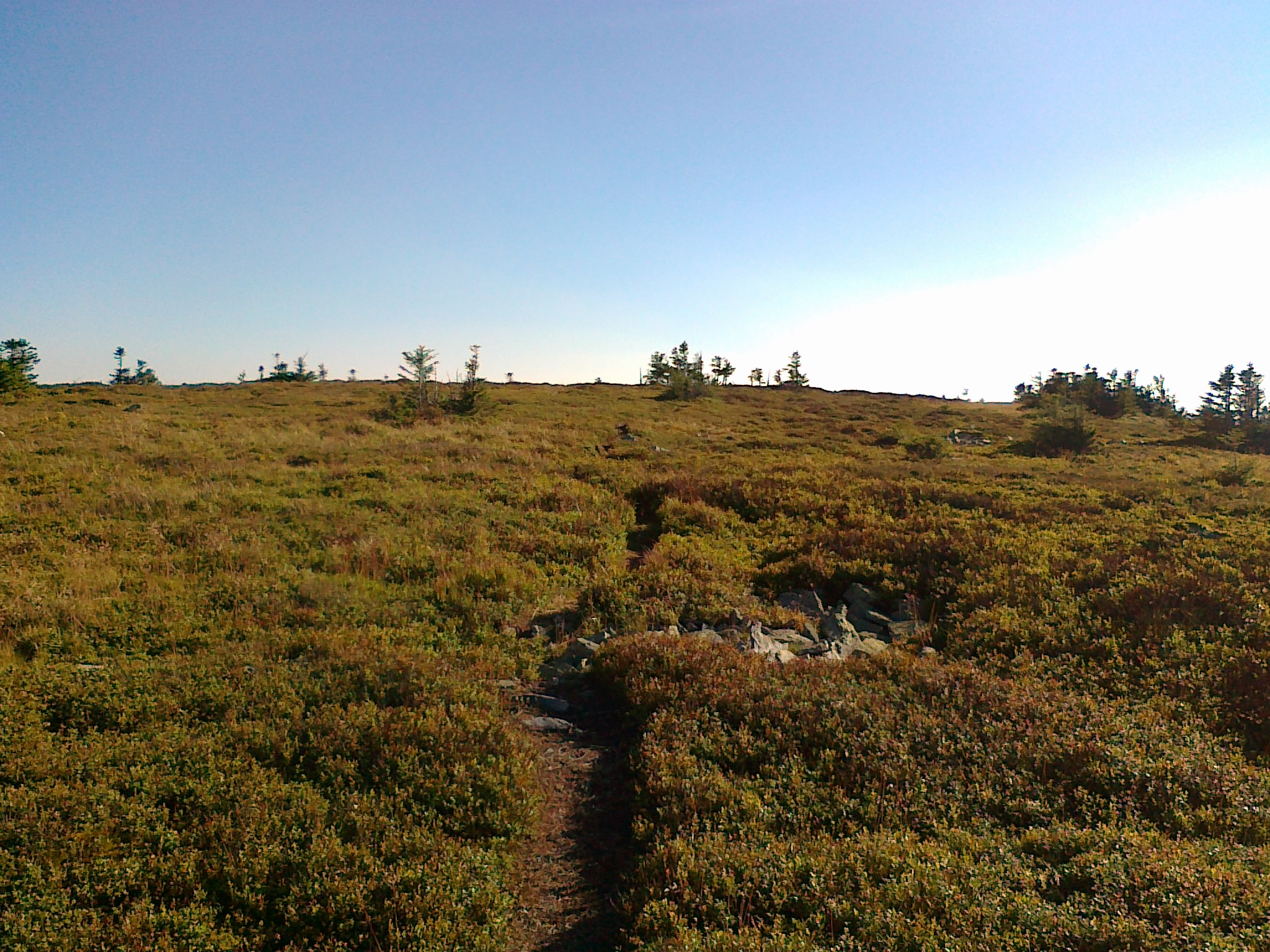
Summit of Břidličná hora

There is no marked tourist trail leading to the summit. The summit area is exposed, covered with alpine grass, common juniper, stone run, patterned ground, and partially a so-called "stone sea" of rock debris. The summit area is an excellent vantage point offering distant views. There is no triangulation station on the summit area. Near the summit area, there is a main path marked with posts, which includes, among others, a green tourist trail. The state geodetic office named Český úřad zeměměřický a katastrální (CÚZK) in Prague lists the highest point of the mountain – the summit – at an elevation of 1,358.2 m above sea level and geographic coordinates 50°01′58.7″N 17°11′12.7″E.

Access to the summit is from the tourist junction named Jelení studánka, from which one must take the green tourist trail towards the junction named Pecný for a distance of about 700 m, then turn approximately right onto an unmarked path, reaching the summit after about 200 m. Due to nature conservation, entry to the summit is not recommended.

=== Secondary summit ===
Břidličná hora is a mountain with a double peak. Approximately 1.2 km northwest of the main summit, there is a secondary summit referred to as Břidličná hora–SZ, with an elevation of 984 m above sea level and geographic coordinates 50°02′23.4″N 17°10′26.7″E, separated from the main summit by a low pass at an elevation of 980 m above sea level. It is situated within dense mixed forest. Due to the forest cover, it is not a vantage point, nor does it have a triangulation station.

=== Geology ===
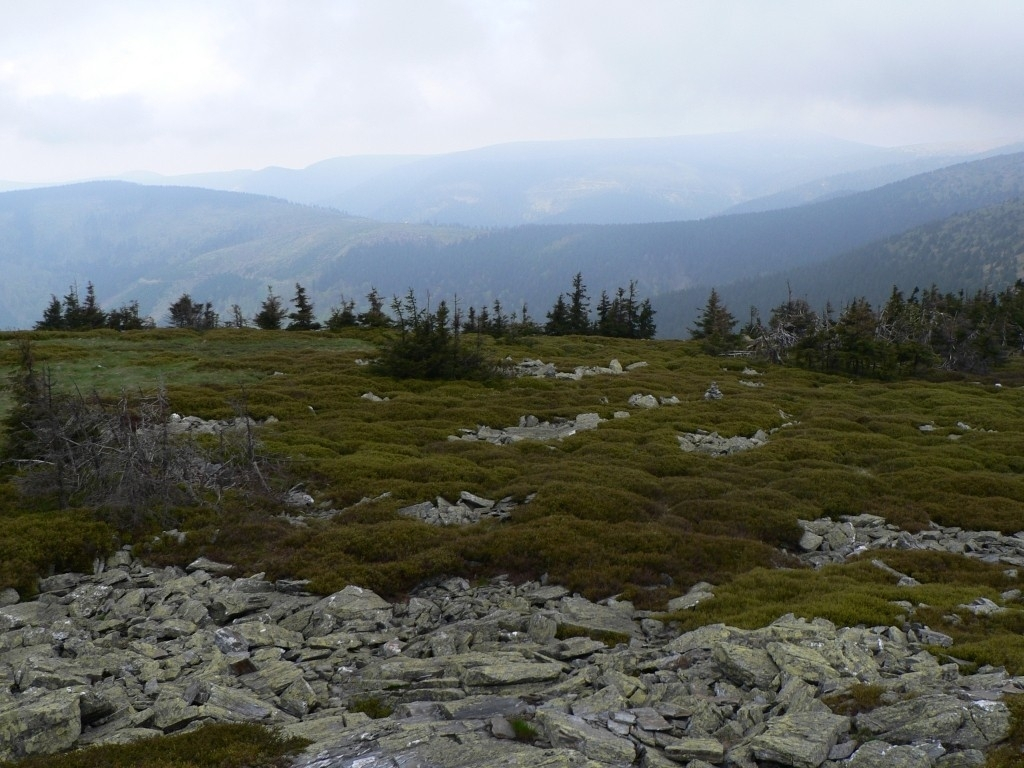
Patterned ground on Břidličná hora

Geologically, the massif of Břidličná hora belongs to the unit known as the Vrbno layers and is composed of metamorphic rocks, mainly phyllites (muscovite, biotite, chlorite), mica schists, from which the Czech name of the peak is derived (Czech: břidlice, meaning schist) (chloritoid, staurolite, garnet, sillimanite), greenschist, graphite schists, gneisses, quartzites, igneous rockss, primarily meta-granites, and sedimentary rocks, primarily meta-conglomerates.

In the Pleistocene, under a periglacial cold climate, extensive stone runs, cryoplanation terraces, and patterned ground formed in the upper parts of the mountain. These stone runs are active, moving at an average speed from 1 to 4 mm per year. The highest measured speed was 15 cm a year. The stone runs and other periglacial formations are among the most valuable of their kind in the Czech Republic.

=== Waters ===
Břidličná hora summit

Climate chart (precipitation, max. and min. temperature)
J	F	M	A	M	J	J	A	S	O	N	D
37 −5 −10	36 −4 −9	52 0 −6	65 7 −2	113 12 3	113 14 6	123 17 8	98 17 8	70 12 4	42 8 0	49 1 −4	39 −4 −8
- █ Average max. and min. temperatures in °C
- █ Precipitation totals in mm
- Source: Climate of Břidličná hora
Imperial conversion
J	F	M	A	M	J	J	A	S	O	N	D
1.5 23 14	1.4 25 16	2 32 21	2.6 45 28	4.4 54 37	4.4 57 43	4.8 63 46	3.9 63 46	2.8 54 39	1.7 46 32	1.9 34 25	1.5 25 18
- █ Average max. and min. temperatures in °F
- █ Precipitation totals in inches

The main ridge (crest) of Praděd mountain, running from Skřítek Pass to Červenohorské sedlo pass and further to Ramzovské sedlo pass, forms part of the boundary of the European watershed, dividing the drainage basins of the Baltic Sea and the Black Sea.

The mountain lies on this boundary, with its southeastern slopes draining into the Baltic Sea basin (Oder river basin) and its eastern, southern, western, northwestern, and northern slopes draining into the Black Sea basin (Danube river basin). On the northern slope, the Jelení příkop stream originates, and on the southeastern slope, another stream called Podolský potok starts. Additionally, about 1.3 km southeast, at an elevation of about 1,113 m above sea level, there is a waterfall on a stream that is a tributary of Podolský potok.

== Nature conservation ==
Part of the mountain lies within the Břidličná Nature Reserve (Czech: Přírodní rezervace Břidličná), which includes the summit area along with the eastern, southern, and northern slopes, and parts of the southeastern, western, and northwestern slopes. This reserve is a part of the designated protected area called the Jeseníky Protected Landscape Area (Czech: Chráněná krajinná oblast (CHKO) Jeseníky), established to protect geological, soil, and plant formations as well as rare animal species.

In 2009, an educational trail was established along the main ridge of Praděd mountain. This trail, known as the Ridges Trail – World of Mountain Meadows (Czech: Naučná stezka Po hřebenech – světem horských luk), spans 12 km from Ovčárna to Skřítek Pass, featuring 12 observation points along the route.

=== Břidličná Nature Reserve ===
The Břidličná Nature Reserve is located at elevations ranging from 798 to 1,367 m above sea level. In addition to Břidličná hora, the reserve also encompasses other mountains or peaks such as Velký Máj, Jelení hřbet, Čertova stěna, Pecný, Pec, Ztracené kameny, Ztracené skály and Zelené kameny. The reserve covers a total area of 652.09 ha and was established on 19 March 2008 to protect the environment around the main ridge of Praděd mountain. The reserve aims to preserve cryogenic geomorphological formations (rock outcrops, rock formations, scree, patterned ground, and stone runs) as well as subalpine forest habitats dominated by Norway spruce and beech, along with strictly protected plants and animals. To safeguard this valuable ecosystem, deeper exploration of the reserve is not recommended.

== Tourism ==
The Czech Tourist Club has marked two hiking trails in the area of Břidličná hora:

Skřítek – Ztracené skály – summit of Ztracené kameny – summit of Pec – summit of Pecný – Břidličná hora mountain – Jelení studánka – Jelení hřbet mountain – Sedlo nad Malým kotlem pass – Velký Máj mountain – U Františkovy myslivny – Zámčisko–S mountain – Zámčisko–SZ mountain – U Kamenné chaty

Sobotín – Vernířovice – Špičák mountain – Čertova stěna – Břidličná hora mountain – Jelení studánka – Jelenka mountain – Mravenčí sedlo pass – Zelené kameny – Skřítek

=== Cycling routes and ski trails ===
A cycling route has been marked at the foot of the western slope on the following trail:

Pod Ztracenými kameny – Pecný mountain – Špičák mountain – Jestřábí vrch mountain – Branka pass – Homole mountain – Vřesník mountain – Kozí hřbet – Čepel mountain – Uhlířská cesta

There are no downhill skiing trails on Břidličná hora. However, during snowy periods, cross-country skiing trails follow the hiking and cycling paths. One of the prominent trails is the so-called Jesenická magistrála:

Nad Karlovem – Klobouk mountain – Mravencovka pass – Jelenec – Jelenka mountain – Alfrédka – Břidličná hora mountain – Pecný mountain – Zelené kameny – Skřítek
