= Homole (mountain) =

Mountain in the Czech Republic

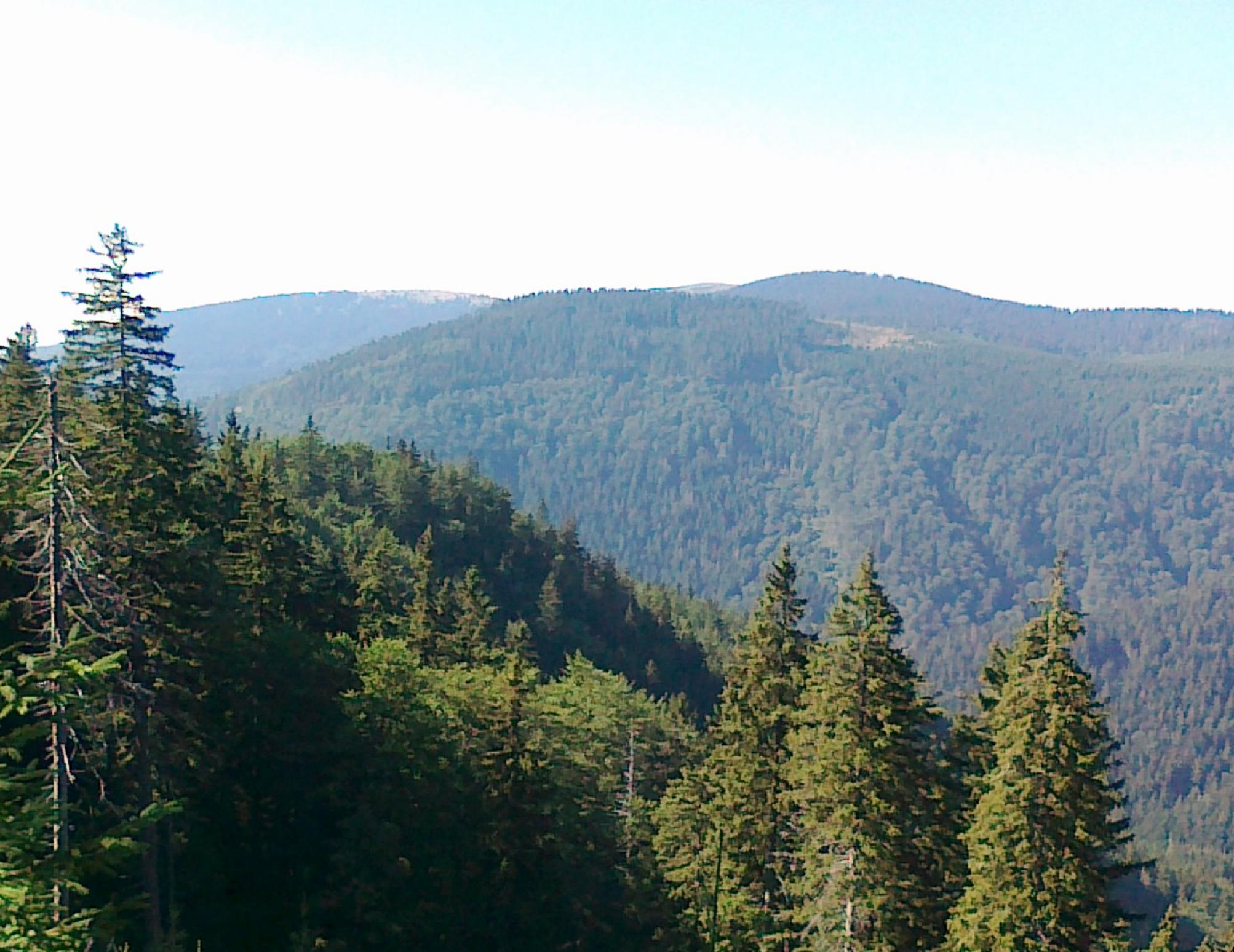
- View from the yellow tourist trail on the slope of the mountain Břidličná hora to the mountains Mravenečník, Homole, Vřesník and Malá Jezerná

Highest point
- Elevation: 1,209 m (3,967 ft)
- Prominence: 21 m (69 ft)
- Coordinates: 50°03′17″N 17°10′13″E

Geography
- Location within Czech Republic
- Location: Vernířovice
- Parent range: Hrubý Jeseník

Homole (historical name in German: Hüttel Berg and in Czech: Hutisko) is a mountain in the Hrubý Jeseník mountain range in the Czech Republic. It has an elevation of 1,209 m (3,967 ft) above sea level. It is located in the municipality of Vernířovice.

Homole is a double-peaked mountain that has been the subject of geological research, leading to the discovery of numerous mineral resources. The mountain is situated within the Jeseníky Protected Landscape Area. The Zadní Hutisko Nature Monument has been established on part of its southern slope.

== Characteristics ==
=== Location ===
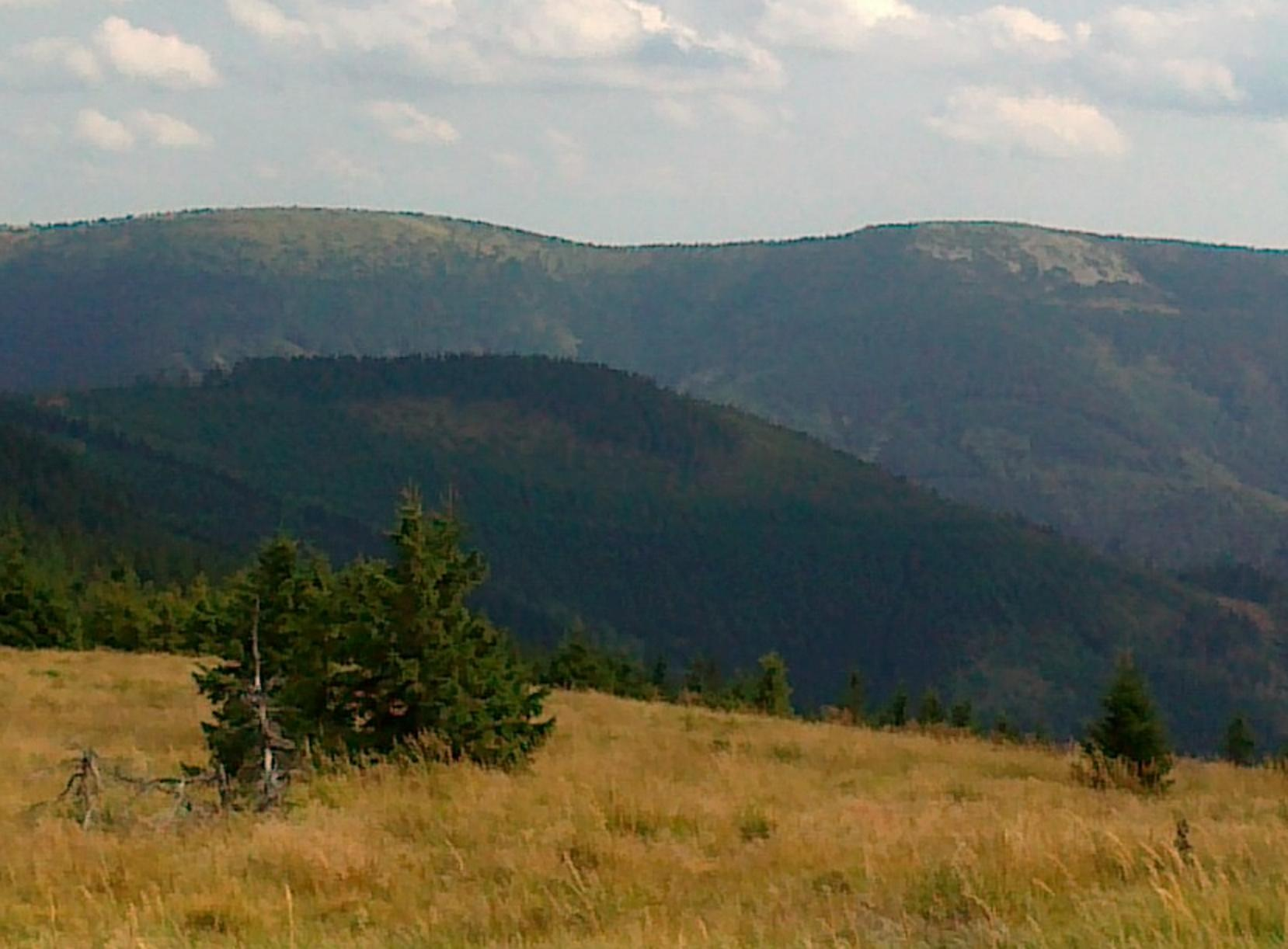
View from the slope of Mravenečník to Jelení hřbet and Břidličná hora (below Homole)

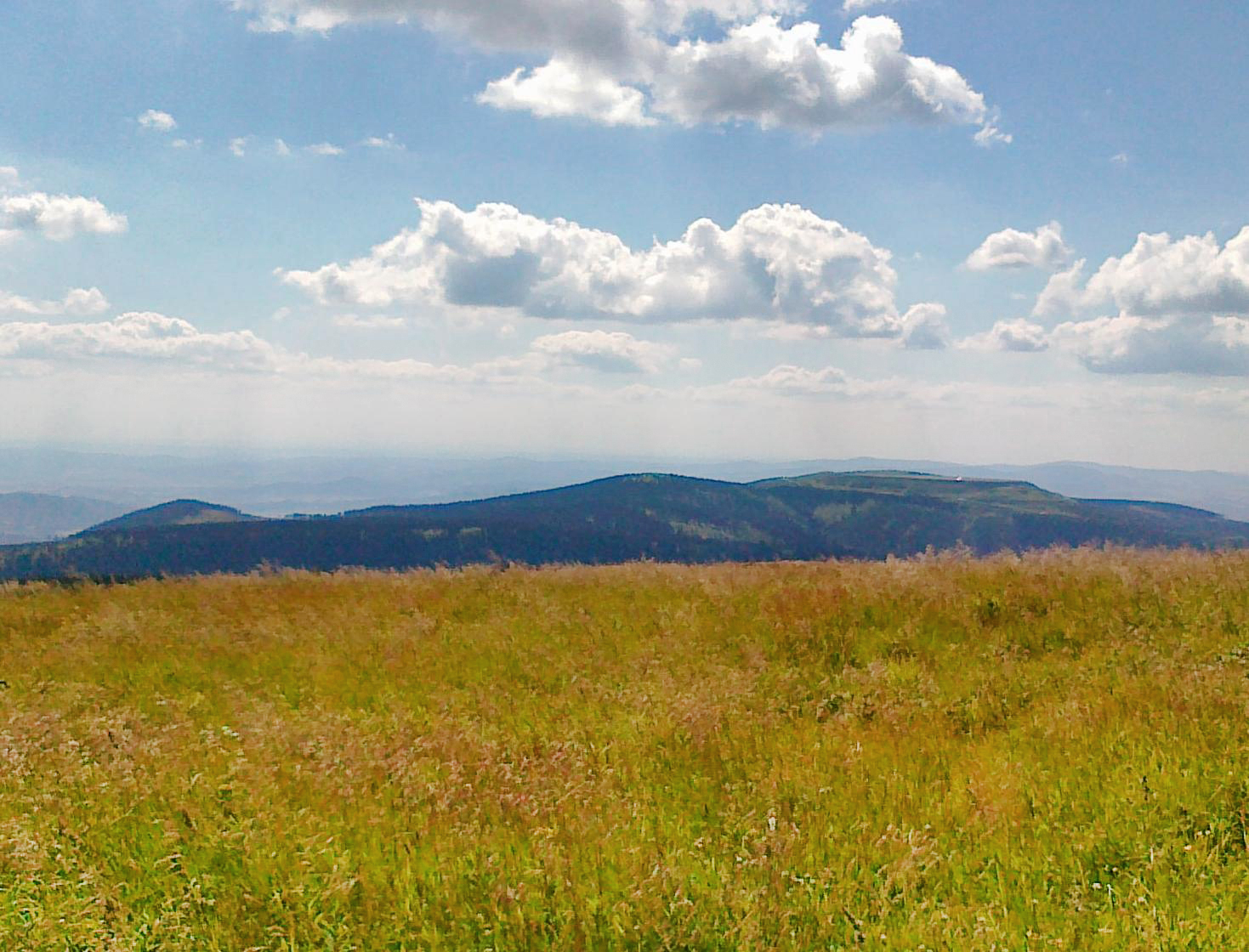
View from the top of the Praděd on the mountains: Homole, Vřesník, Dlouhé stráně (above it the peak of Mravenečník) and Kamenec

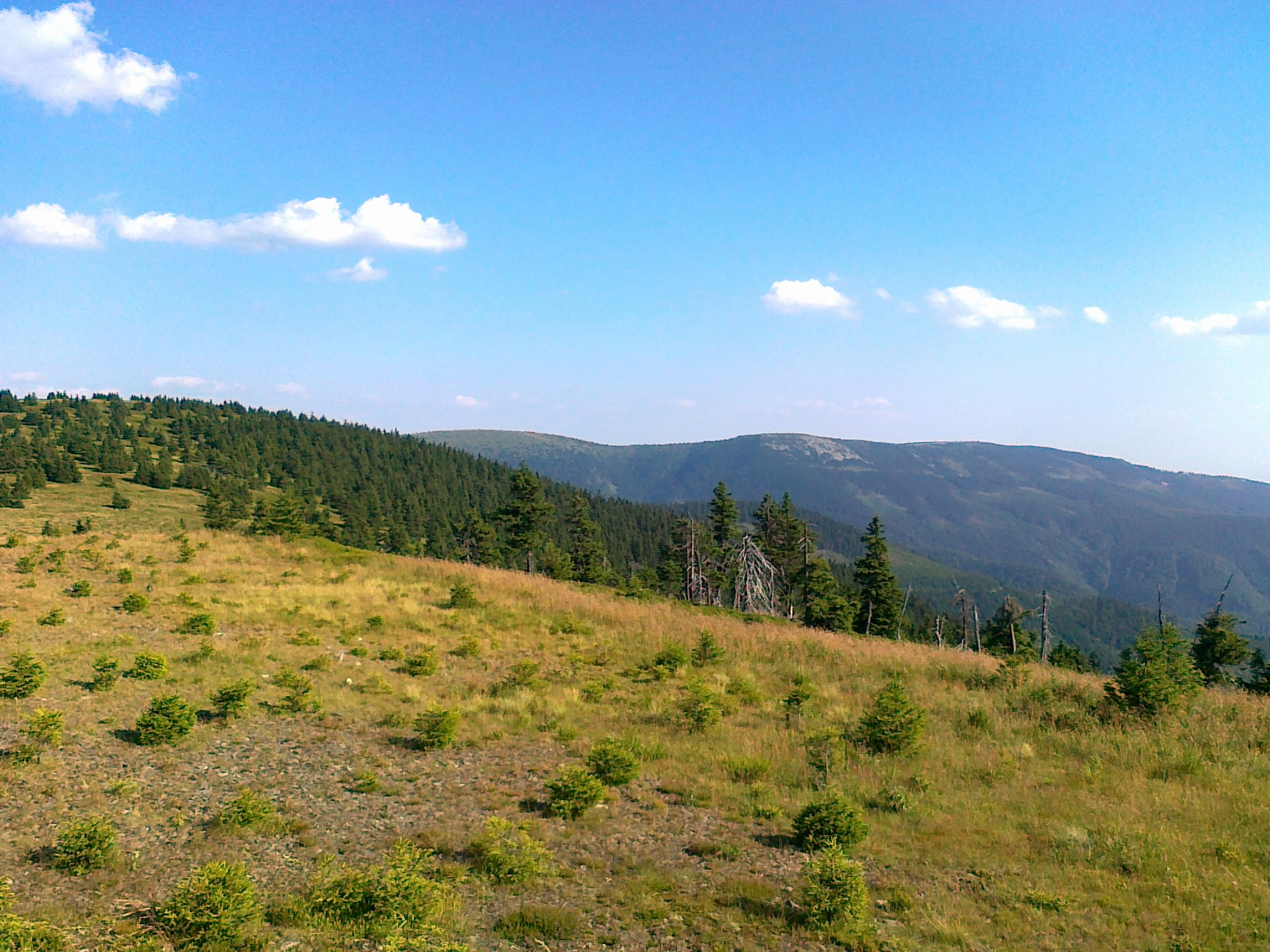
View from the lower road around the Dlouhé stráně to the Pláň pass and to the peaks of the mountains: Vřesník, Jelení hřbet, Břidličná hora and Pecný (below Břidličná hora is the summit of Homole)

Homole is situated in the southwestern region of the Hrubý Jeseník mountain range, specifically within the microregion of Praděd Mountains. It is located on an arched side ridge that extends from the Hubertka mountain to the Vlčí Sedlo pass, following the path Vřesník–Homole–Jestřábí vrch–Vernířovice. A distinctive feature of Homole is its nearly flat, straight summit ridge, which is about 400 meters long and runs in a southwest-northeast direction. The mountain is difficult to identify, visible, for example, from the main ridge of Praděd mountain. When traveling between the peaks of Vysoká hole and Pecný, Homole can be seen as if it is "clinging" to Vřesník mountain. However, due to the towering peaks of Mravenečník, Dlouhé stráně, and Vřesník, it is challenging to locate and identify from other areas. It is not marked on the information boards at the summit of Dlouhé stráně, and its summit is often not labeled on many maps. A possible clue to its location is that it lies southeast of the mentioned three prominent mountains (Mravenečník–Dlouhé stráně–Vřesník). The summit is clearly visible from the road that encircles the summit of Praděd, where it emerges from the left side of Vřesník. Additionally, from another viewpoint along the road encircling Dlouhé stráně, Homole is visible below the line of sight toward Břidličná hora.

The mountain is bounded by:

- to the north, a pass at 1,188 meters above sea level leading toward Vřesník;
- to the northeast, east, and south, the valley of the Merta stream;
- to the southwest, the Branka pass leading toward Jestřábí vrch;
- to the west, the valley of a stream named Studený potok;
- to the northwest, the valley of an unnamed stream, a tributary of Studený potok, flowing through a couloir called Kančí žleb.

Surrounding the mountain are the following peaks:

- Kozí hřbet, Mravenečník, Dlouhé stráně, and Vřesník to the northwest;
- Malá Jezerná to the north;
- Velká Jezerná and Velká Jezerná–J to the northeast;
- Hubertka to the east;
- Velký Máj, Jelení hřbet, and Čertova stěna to the southeast;
- Břidličná hora–SZ and Špičák to the south;
- Jestřábí vrch and Nad myslivnou to the southwest.

=== Slopes ===
Homole features six main slopes:

- northern
- northeastern
- southeastern, known as Vyhlídka
- southern, known as Na hrázi
- southwestern
- western

All types of forestation can be found here: spruce forest, mixed forest, (Note: The forest stand of the entire Jeseníky Protected Landscape Area includes: European spruce 84%, European beech 10%, European larch 1.5%, sycamore maple 1.1%, birch 1%, common alder 0.8%, dwarf mountain pine 0.4%, grey alder 0.3%, (European silver fir, European ash, and linden) 0.2%, Scotch pine 0.1%, and others (Pinus mugo, oak, hornbeam, Norway maple, elm, rowan, green alder, aspen, poplar, and goat willow) 0.2%.) and deciduous forest, with spruce forest predominating. The slopes are predominantly covered by spruce forest, which transitions into mixed forest and, except for the northern slope, into deciduous forest as elevation decreases. The slopes also exhibit significant variation in forest cover, including clearings and substantial deforestation areas. In some of these deforested areas, fallen tree trunks are visible. The southeastern, southern, and western slopes feature rock formations, with the southeastern slope having a rock formation extending approximately 430 meters. Near this rock formation, areas of boulder fields can also be found.

The slopes generally have uniform but varied inclinations. The average slope gradient ranges from 3° (northern slope) to 29° (western slope), with the weighted arithmetic mean for all slopes being approximately 19°. The maximum arithmetic mean on the southeast slope near the rock formations, at an elevation of about 970 meters above sea level over a 50-meter stretch, does not exceed 50°. The slopes are crisscrossed by a network of roads (including Hrázová cesta), which have been developed into hiking and cycling trails, along with generally unmarked, few paths and tracks.

Approximately 500 meters southwest of the summit lies an inactive mining site known as Štola na Homoli, a remnant of iron ore extraction. Mining operations were conducted here in the 19th and early 20th centuries before being abandoned.

=== Main summit ===
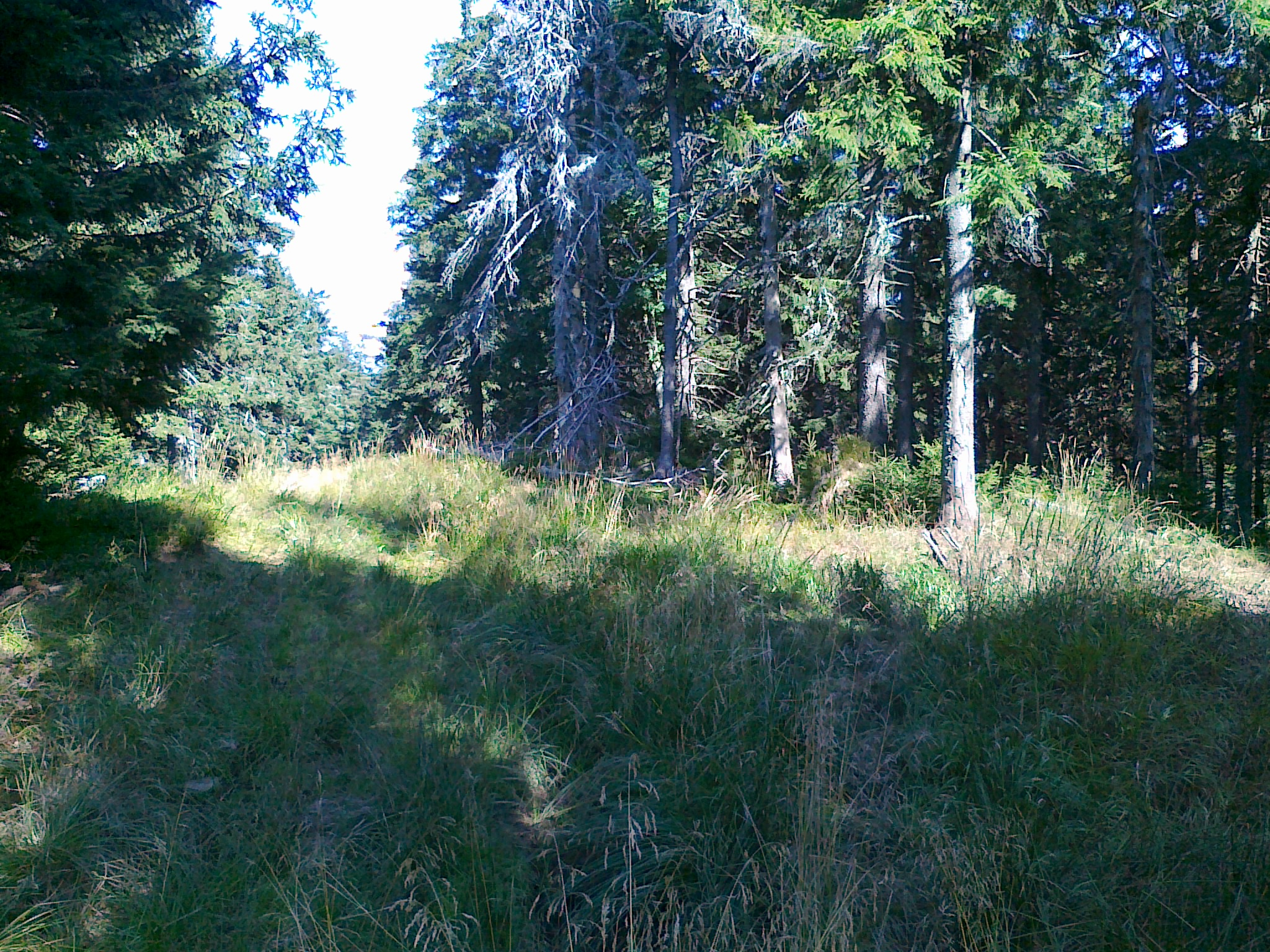
Summit of Homole

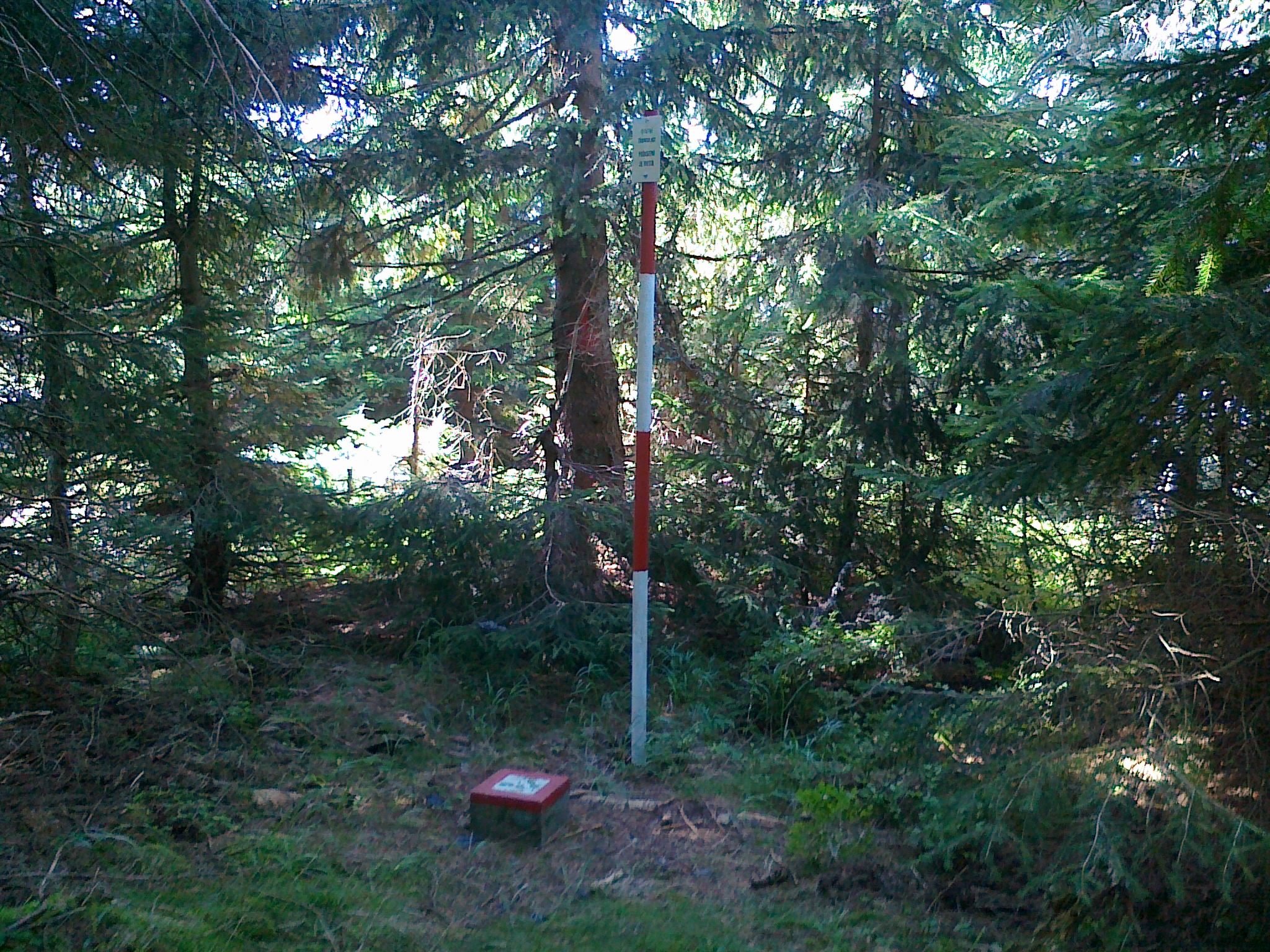
Triangulation station at the summit area of Homole

The summit of Homole does not have any marked tourist trails leading directly to it. A main road runs across the summit plateau, connecting the main summit with the secondary summit Homole–SV, along a ridge from the pass towards the peak of Vřesník. The summit itself is located near this main road, amidst a spruce forest, and is covered with alpine grass as well as the European blueberry, which are a common plant in the Hrubý Jeseník mountains. Due to the forest cover, the summit does not offer any significant views.

On the summit plateau, there is a triangulation station marked on geodetic maps with the number 34, at an elevation of 1,209.21 meters above sea level, with geographical coordinates 50°03′17.28″N 17°10′13.21″E. Near this point, there is a metal post painted with alternating horizontal white and red stripes, warning against damage, with a sign that reads Státní triangulace Poškození se trestá (State triangulation station. Damage is punishable). The Czech Office for Surveying, Mapping, and Cadastre (Czech: Český úřad zeměměřický a katastrální, CÚZK) in Prague lists the highest point of the mountain – the summit – at an elevation of 1,209.3 meters above sea level, with geographical coordinates 50°03′17.4″N 17°10′13.2″E, located about 4 meters north of the triangulation station.

Access to the summit is via the green cycling trail that runs around the entire mountain and the pass towards Vřesník. From this trail, there is an unmarked path about 560 meters long that passes through the plateau of the secondary summit Homole–SV.

=== Secondary summit ===
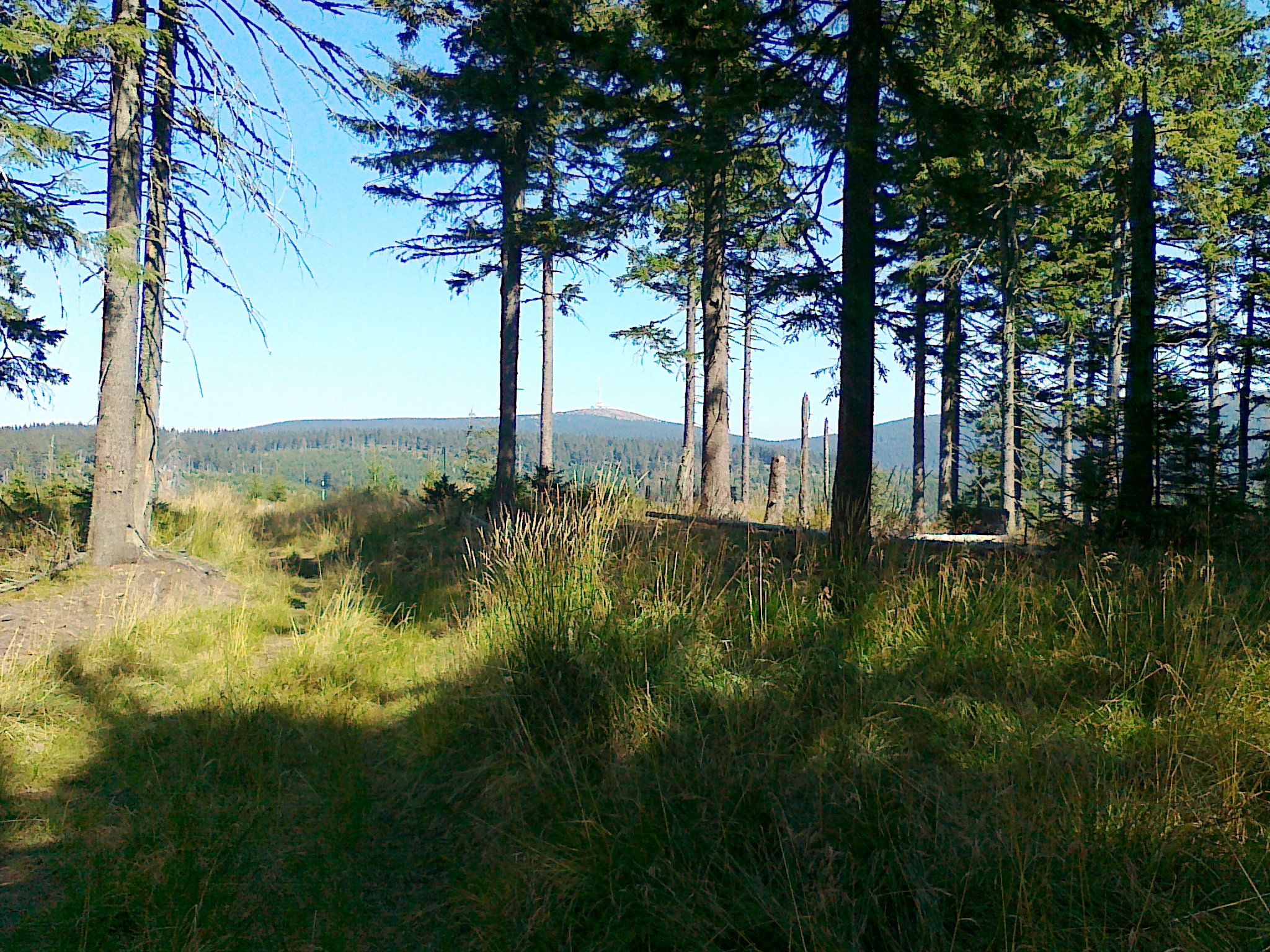
Area of the secondary summit Homole–SV

Homole is a double-peaked mountain. About 215 meters northeast of the main summit lies the secondary summit, known as Homole–SV, with an elevation of 1,206 meters above sea level and geographical coordinates 50°03′22.5″N 17°10′20.6″E. This summit is located on the mountain's ridge, along the main road, and is separated from the main summit by a subtle pass at an elevation of 1,202 meters above sea level. The secondary summit is also surrounded by spruce forest. Due to the forest cover, the summit plateau offers limited views, with some perspectives towards Praděd. Unlike the main summit, there is no triangulation station on the Homole–SV plateau, and this secondary summit is only marked on detailed maps.

=== Geology ===
Geologically, the Homole massif belongs to the unit known as the Desná Dome and is composed of metamorphic rocks, mainly gneisses (biotite, muscovite) and amphibolites. Homole has historically been a site of geological research aimed at discovering mineral resources or gemstones. These studies have led to the discovery of minerals such as actinolite, asbestos, and magnetite crystals, which are now featured in many international exhibits. Additionally, other minerals found in the area include epidote, orthoclase, titanite, and prehnite. One of the mineralogists conducting research in this area was Gerhard vom Rath.

=== Waters ===
The summit and slopes of Homole are located to the northwest of the European watershed boundary, which divides the drainage basins of the Baltic Sea and the Black Sea, placing them within the Black Sea drainage basin. Waters from this area, including those from the Danube river basin, flow into the Black Sea, fed by mountain streams such as the Merta and Studený potok, which flow near the mountain. Additionally, on the Merta stream, about 740 meters east of the summit, at an elevation of approximately 881 meters above sea level, there is a waterfall known as Vodopád Merty, which is about 4 meters high.

=== Nature protection ===
The entire Homole mountain is located within the Jeseníky Protected Landscape Area, a designated conservation area aimed at protecting rock formations, soil, plant life, and rare animal species. The southern slope of the mountain is home to the Zadní Hutisko Nature Monument, a protected area.

To safeguard this unique ecosystem, a circular educational trail known as the Lesní ekostezka Švagrov was established in 2000. This 4.5 km long trail starts in the Švagrov settlement and partially (around 820 m) runs along the western slope of Homole. The route includes 12 observation points and passes through significant areas such as Švagrov, Švagrovské údolí, Vřesník, Homole, and Jestřabí vrch.

=== Zadní Hutisko Nature Monument ===
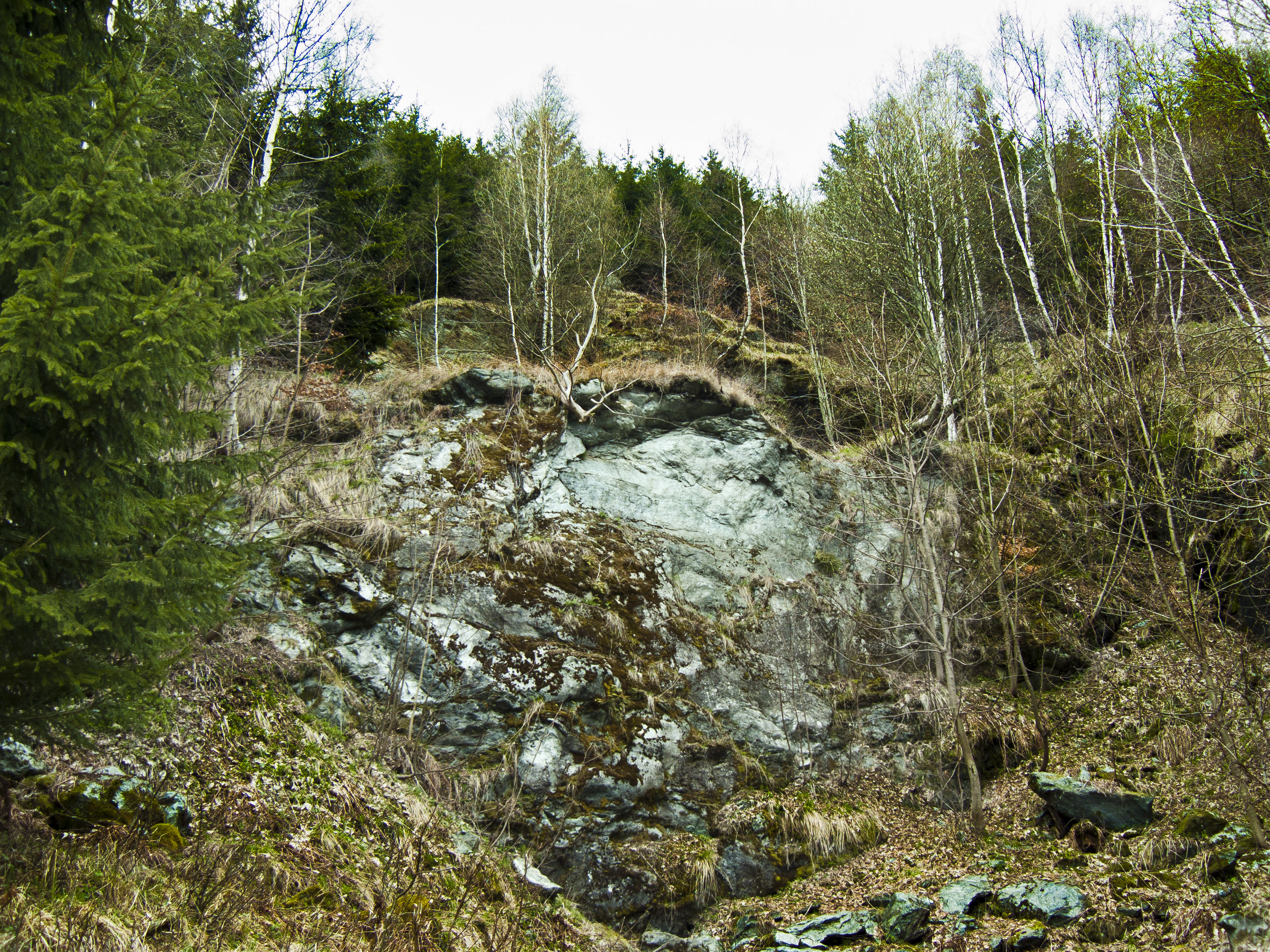
Zadní Hutisko Nature Monument

The Zadní Hutisko Nature Monument is located at an elevation of between 813 and 855 meters on the southern slope of Homole, about 750 meters from the summit, covering an area of approximately 0.30 hectares. Established on 24 August 1982, it aims to protect unique rock and geological formations that remain from a historical quarry. It is accessible via a blue tourist trail and a blue cycling route near the Hrázová cesta road.

== Tourism ==
=== Hiking trails ===
The Czech Tourist Club has established one hiking trail that passes through the Homole area:

Kosaře – Merta valley – Zadní Hutisko Nature Monument – Homole – Branka pass – Velká Jezerná – Hubertka – U Františkovy myslivny

=== Cycling and cross-country skiing trails ===
Three cycling trails have been marked on the slopes of Homole:

Pod Ztracenými kameny – Pecný – Špičák – Jestřábí vrch – Branka pass – Homole – Vřesník – Dlouhé stráně – Mravenečník – Kozí hřbet – Čepel – Uhlířská cesta

Mravenečník – Kamenec – Dlouhé stráně – Vřesník – Homole – Vřesník – Dlouhé stráně – Mravenečník

Pod Homolí – Vyhlídka – Branka pass

During snowy periods, these cycling trails double as cross-country skiing routes. However, no downhill skiing trails have been established on Homole.
