= Vernířovice =

- Municipality
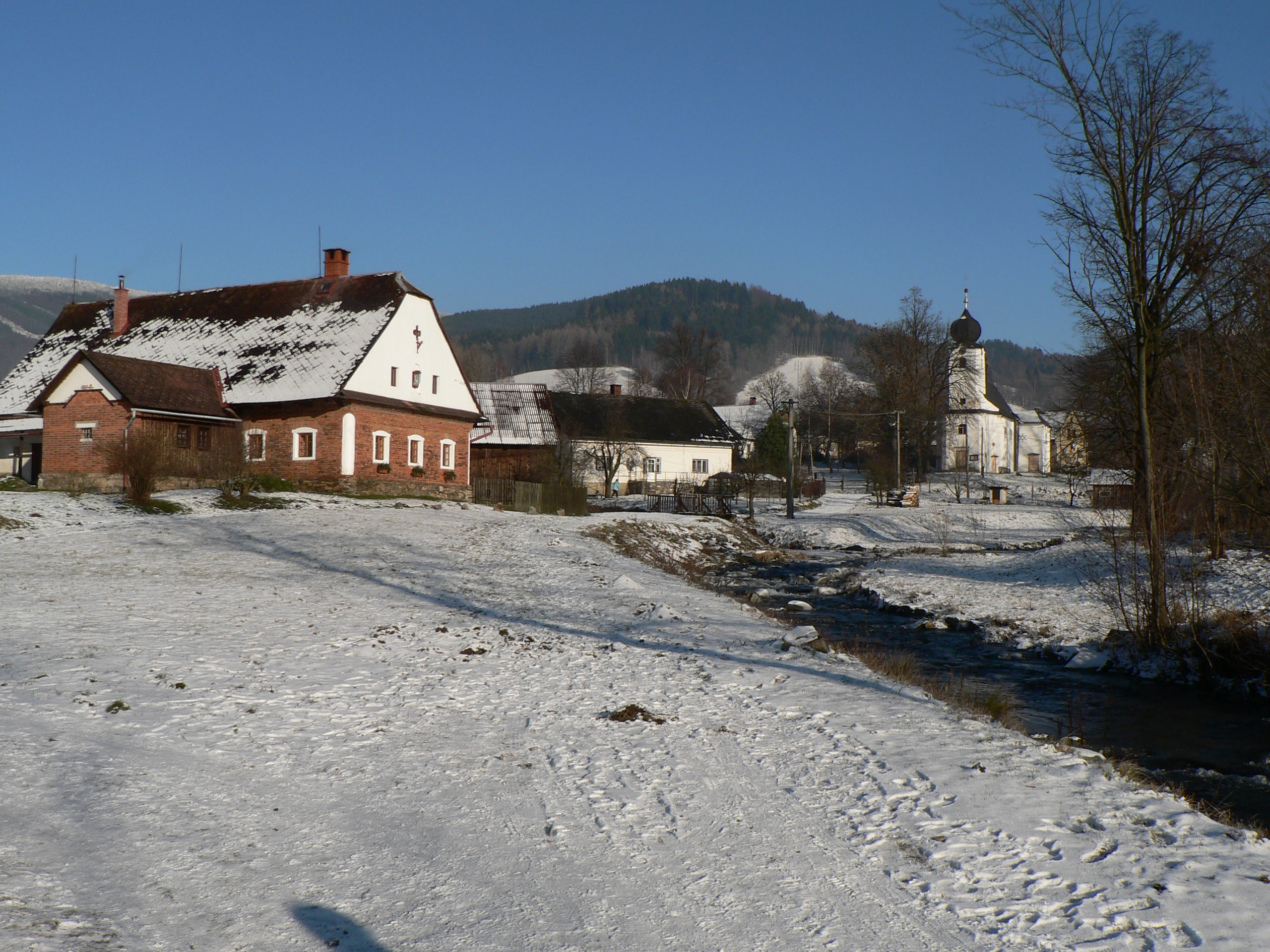
- View towards the Church of Saint Matthew

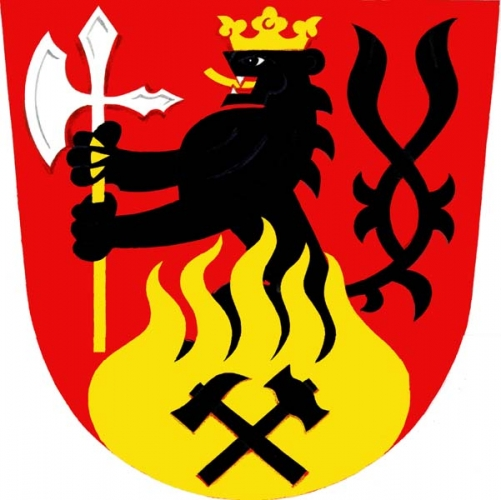
- Flag Coat of arms

- Location in the Czech Republic
- Coordinates: 50°1′54″N 17°7′49″E
- Country: Czech Republic
- Region: Olomouc
- District: Šumperk
- First mentioned: 1558

Area
  - Total: 33.30 km^{2} (12.86 sq mi)
- Elevation: 524 m (1,719 ft)

Population (2026-01-01)
  - Total: 196
  - Density: 5.89/km^{2} (15.2/sq mi)
- Time zone: UTC+1 (CET)
  - Summer (DST): UTC+2 (CEST)
- Postal codes: 788 15
- Website: www.obec-vernirovice.cz

Vernířovice (German: Wermsdorf) is a municipality and village in Šumperk District in the Olomouc Region of the Czech Republic. It has about 200 inhabitants.

== Geography ==
Vernířovice is located about 13 kilometres (8 mi) northeast of Šumperk and 49 km (30 mi) north of Olomouc. The municipal territory lies mostly in the Hrubý Jeseník mountain range, but the village proper lies on the border of Hrubý Jeseník with the Hanušovice Highlands. The Merta River originates here and then flows across the municipality. The highest point is the mountain Jelení hřbet at 1,367 m (4,485 ft) above sea level.

== Demographics ==
Historical population
Year	Pop.	±%
1869	1,381	—
1880	1,389	+0.6%
1890	1,324	−4.7%
1900	1,206	−8.9%
1910	1,141	−5.4%
1921	975	−14.5%
1930	964	−1.1%
1950	314	−67.4%
1961	424	+35.0%
1970	370	−12.7%
1980	249	−32.7%
1991	182	−26.9%
2001	179	−1.6%
2011	193	+7.8%
2021	200	+3.6%
Source: Censuses
