= Dlouhé stráně Hydro Power Plant =

Dlouhé Stráně Hydroelectric Power Station
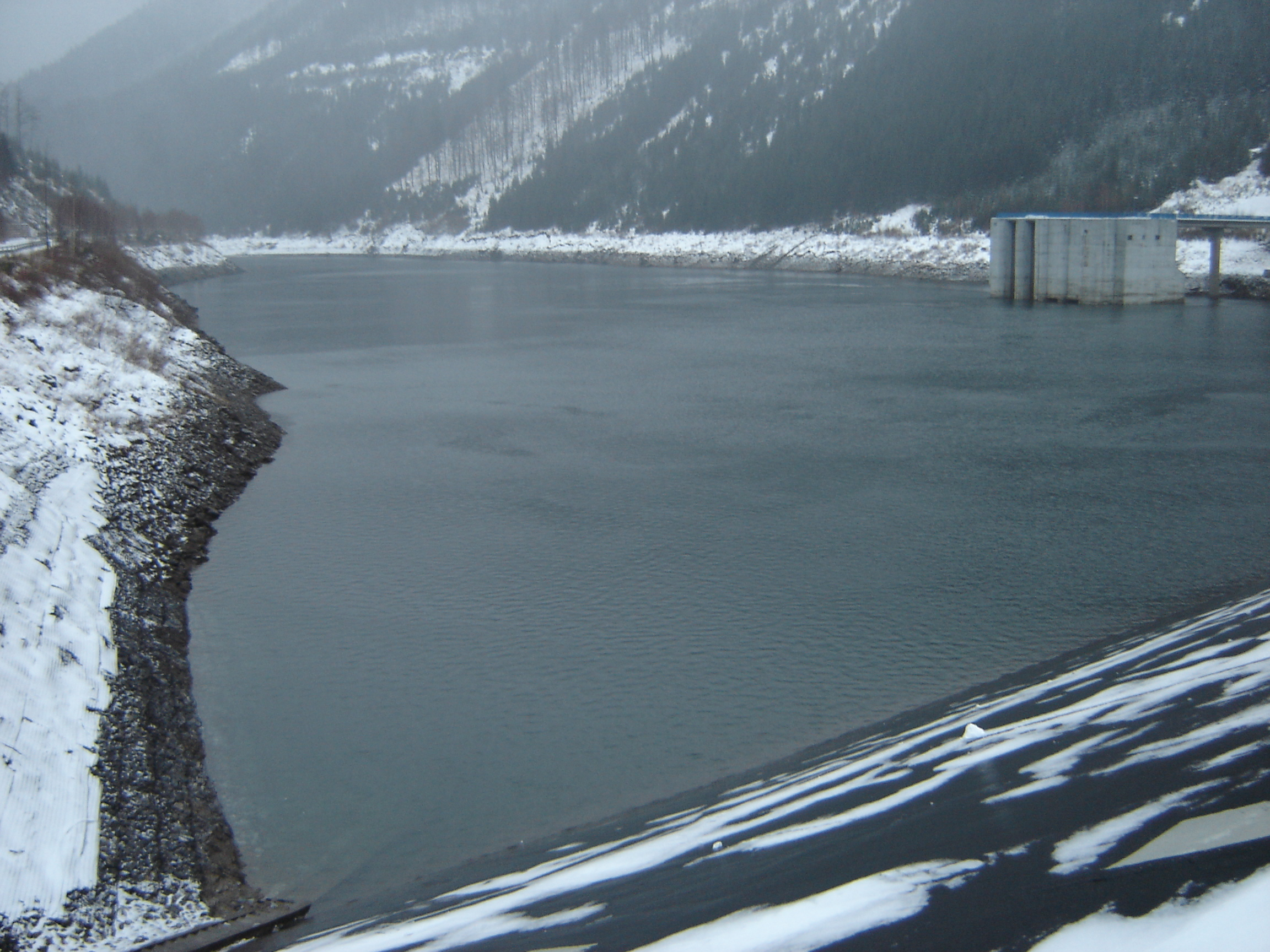
- Interactive map of Dlouhé Stráně Hydroelectric Power Station
- Country: Czech Republic
- Location: Loučná nad Desnou
- Coordinates: 50°05′11″N 17°10′46″E
- Status: Operational
- Construction began: 1978
- Opening date: 1996
- Owner: ČEZ Group

Upper reservoir
- Total capacity: 2.72 million m³.

Lower reservoir
- Total capacity: 3.4 million m³

Power Station
- Turbines: 2
- Pump-generators: 2 × 325 MW

Dlouhé stráně Hydro Power Plant (Czech: Přečerpávací vodní elektrárna Dlouhé stráně) is a large pumped storage plant in the Czech Republic, located on the Desná river. It has 2 turbines with a nominal power of 325 megawatts (436,000 hp) each, providing a total capacity of 650 megawatts (870,000 hp). The elevated reservoir is situated on top of the Dlouhé Stráně mountain, 1,350 metres (4,430 ft) above sea level and the head of turbines is 510 metres (1,670 ft). It has the largest reversing water turbine in Europe.
