= Hrubý Jeseník =

Czech mountain range

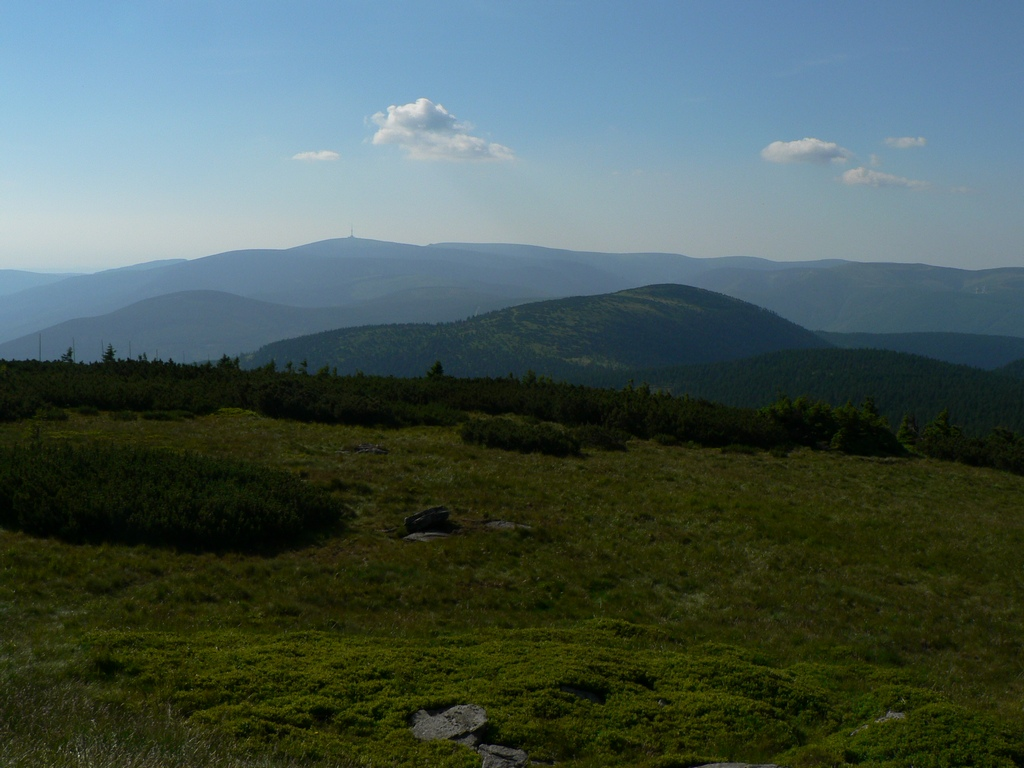
- Červená hora mountain

Highest point
- Peak: Praděd
- Elevation: 1,491 m (4,892 ft)

Dimensions
- Area: 530 km^{2} (200 mi^{2})

Geography
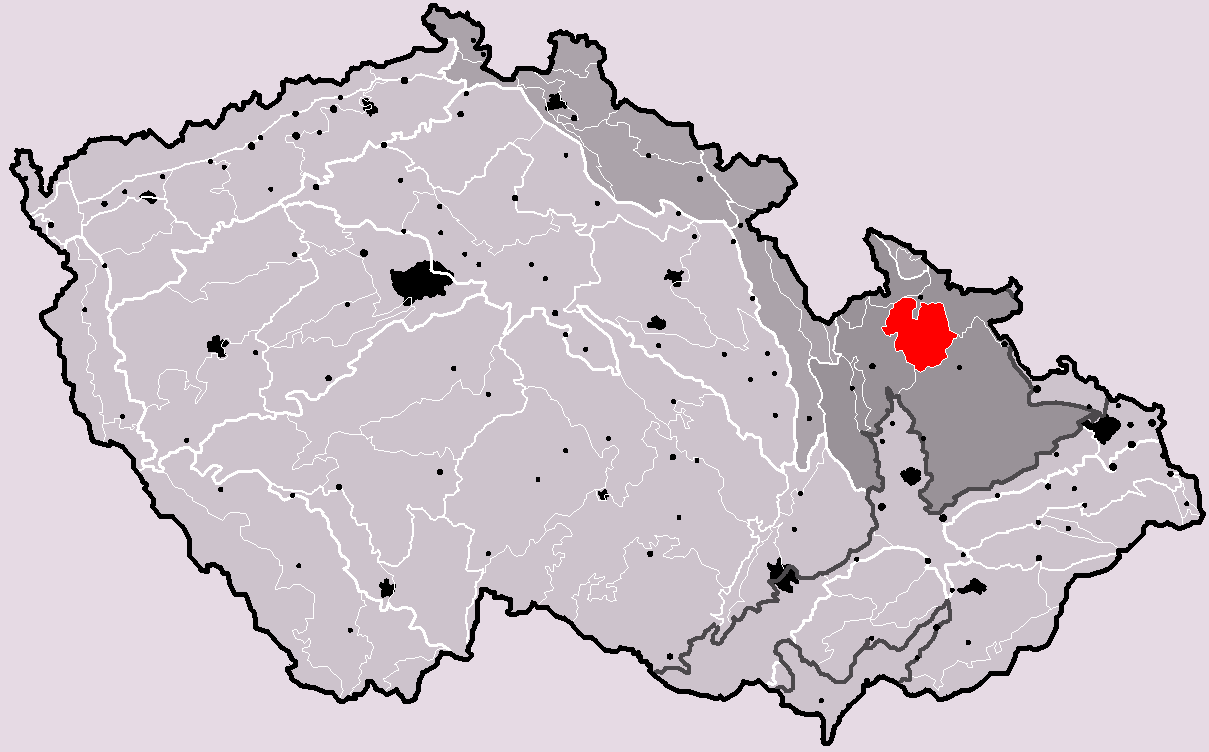
- Hrubý Jeseník in the geomorphological system of the Czech Republic
- Country: Czech Republic
- Regions: Olomouc, Moravian-Silesian
- Range coordinates: 50°5′N 17°14′E
- Parent range: Eastern Sudetes

Geology
- Rock type(s): Gneiss, amphibolite, granite, slate

Hrubý Jeseník (sometimes called High Ash Mountains in English; German: Altvatergebirge or Hohes Gesenke) is a mountain range and geomorphological mesoregion of the Czech Republic. It is located in the east of the country in the Olomouc and Moravian-Silesian regions. It is the second highest mountain range in the Czech Republic.

== Etymology ==
According to the most probable theory, the name has its origin in the word jasan, i.e. 'ash'. Jeseník (respectively Jesenný potok) was first the name of a stream that flowed through an ash forest in a valley. The name was Germanized to Gesenke (i.e. 'slope') and used as a name of a small town that was founded in the valley (but later disappeared), and then it was transferred first to the valley, and then to the whole mountain range. Later the name was changed back to Czech Jeseník. Jeseníky (plural form of Jeseník) is a collective term for an area that includes the mountain ranges of Hrubý Jeseník (literally 'rough Jeseník') and Nízký Jeseník (i.e. 'low Jeseník').

== Geomorphology ==
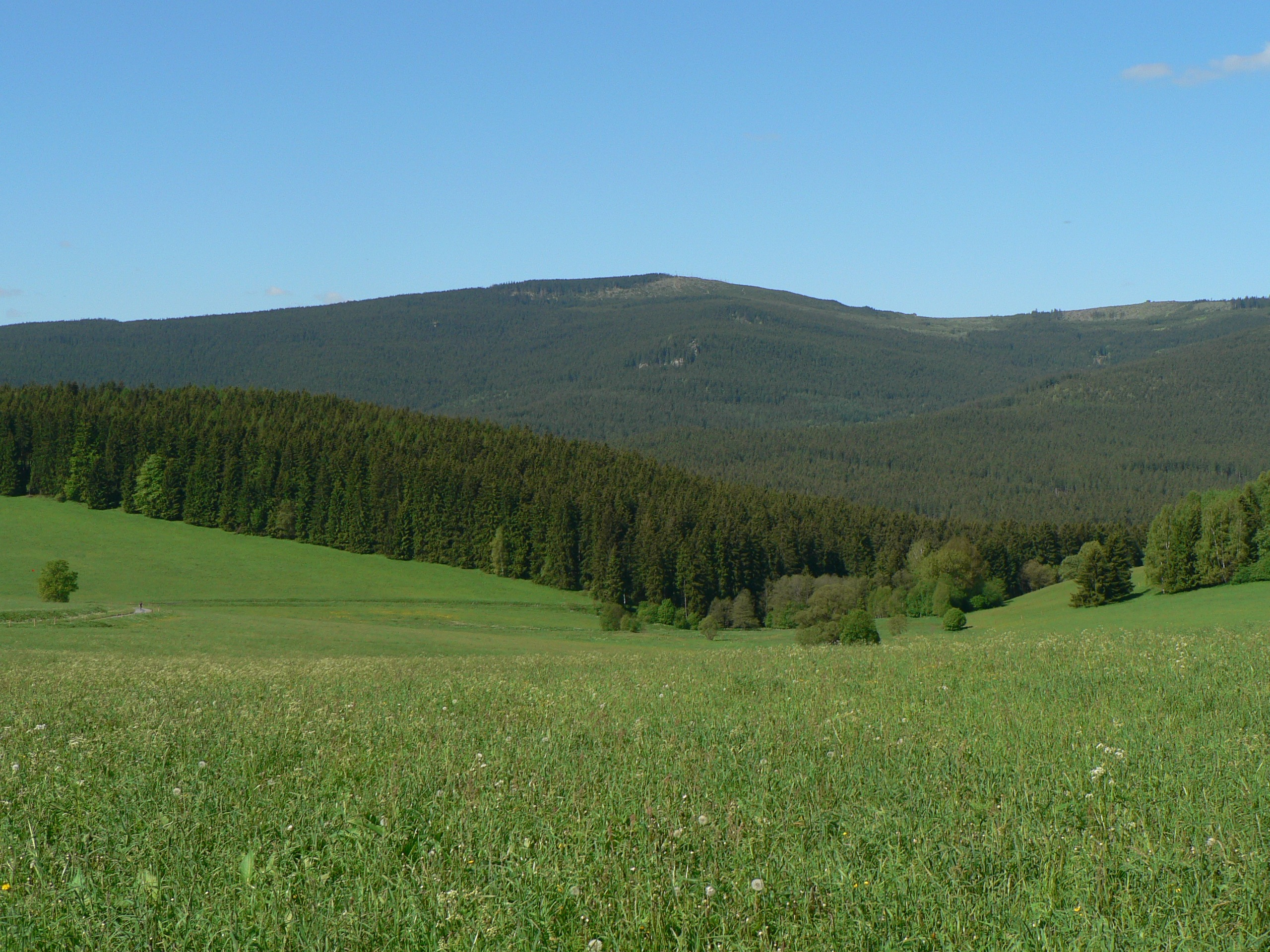
View of Medvědí vrch from the east

Hrubý Jeseník is a mesoregion of the Eastern Sudetes, which is part of the Sudetes within the Bohemian Massif. It is the second-highest mountain range in the Czech Republic. There are 56 peaks with an altitude of at least 1,000 m, which are spread evenly throughout the territory.

It is bordered with the Nízký Jeseník in the southeast, with the Zlatohorská Highlands in the northeast, with the Golden Mountains in the northwest, and with the Hanušovice Highlands in the southwest.

Hrubý Jeseník is further subdivided into the microregions of Keprník Mountains, Medvědí Mountains and Praděd Mountains.

The highest peaks are:

- Praděd, 1,491 m (4,892 ft)
- Vysoká hole, 1,465 m (4,806 ft)
- Petrovy kameny, 1,447 m (4,747 ft)
- Keprník, 1,423 m (4,669 ft)
- Velký Máj, 1,385 m (4,544 ft)
- Vozka, 1,377 m (4,518 ft)
- Malý Děd, 1,369 m (4,491 ft)
- Jelení hřbet, 1,367 m (4,485 ft)
- Břidličná hora, 1,358 m (4,455 ft)
- Dlouhé stráně, 1,354 m (4,442 ft)

A distinctive feature of the relief is also Mt. Medvědí vrch, which at 1,216 m (3,990 ft) is the highest mountain of the Medvědí Mountains microregion and is among the most prominent mountains of Hrubý Jeseník.

== Geography ==
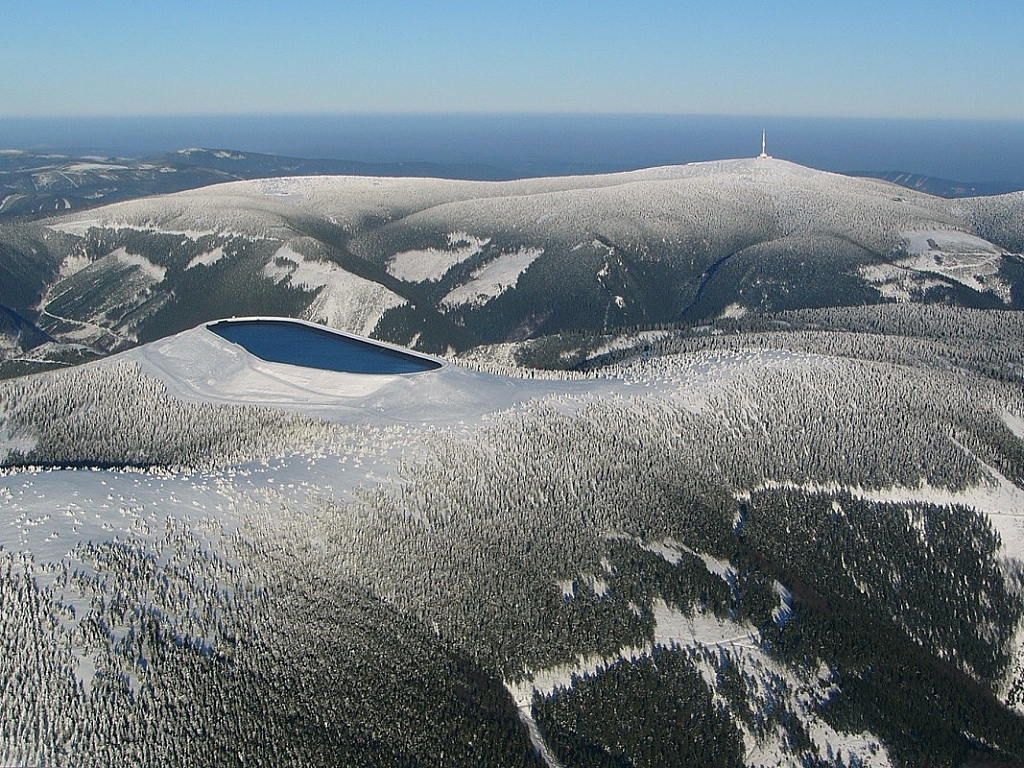
Upper reservoir of Dlouhé stráně

The territory has an approximately circular shape. Hrubý Jeseník has an area of 530 square kilometres (200 sq mi) and an average elevation of 887.6 metres (2,912 ft).

Several rivers and streams originate in the mountain range. The most important are the Desná and the sources of the Opava River. The only notable body of water is the Dlouhé stráně Reservoir.

Due to the mountainous character of the landscape, there are no larger settlements here. The largest settlement in the territory is Vrbno pod Pradědem. The town of Jeseník is located just beyond the borders of the mountain range.

== Climate ==
Climate data for Šerák, 2004–2011 normals, extremes 2004–2011
Month	Jan	Feb	Mar	Apr	May	Jun	Jul	Aug	Sep	Oct	Nov	Dec	Year
Record high °C (°F)	8.6 (47.5)	10.3 (50.5)	13.5 (56.3)	19.9 (67.8)	24.1 (75.4)	28.6 (83.5)	27.1 (80.8)	27.1 (80.8)	25.7 (78.3)	23.2 (73.8)	15.2 (59.4)	8.5 (47.3)	28.6 (83.5)
Daily mean °C (°F)	−5.2 (22.6)	−5.2 (22.6)	−2.5 (27.5)	3.2 (37.8)	7.0 (44.6)	10.9 (51.6)	13.0 (55.4)	12.6 (54.7)	8.3 (46.9)	4.2 (39.6)	0.2 (32.4)	−3.6 (25.5)	3.6 (38.5)
Record low °C (°F)	−26.8 (−16.2)	−23.6 (−10.5)	−19.4 (−2.9)	−10.8 (12.6)	−6.3 (20.7)	−1.3 (29.7)	1.8 (35.2)	0.0 (32.0)	−2.4 (27.7)	−9.2 (15.4)	−13.1 (8.4)	−20.1 (−4.2)	−26.8 (−16.2)
Average precipitation mm (inches)	86.0 (3.39)	65.0 (2.56)	75.0 (2.95)	71.0 (2.80)	128.0 (5.04)	131.0 (5.16)	133.0 (5.24)	110.0 (4.33)	114.0 (4.49)	77.0 (3.03)	81.0 (3.19)	74.0 (2.91)	1,145 (45.08)
Mean monthly sunshine hours	51.4	54.8	104.9	164.8	173.9	170.1	198.0	190.6	142.0	111.0	57.8	43.8	1,463.1
Source 1: World Meteorological Organization (UN)
Source 2: NOAA

== Protection of nature ==
Almost the entire territory of Hrubý Jeseník is protected within the Jeseníky Protected Landscape Area. The Jeseníky PLA then extends further to the north into the Zlatohorská Highlands and to the south into the Hanušovice Highlands. Furthermore, small-scaled protected areas are defined. There are 32 small-scaled protected areas in the Jeseníky PLA. The most important are the national nature reserves Praděd, Šerák-Keprník, Rejvíz and Skřítek (Skřítek and Rejvíz extend only marginally into Hrubý Jeseník), and the Javorový vrch National Nature Monument.

== Gallery ==
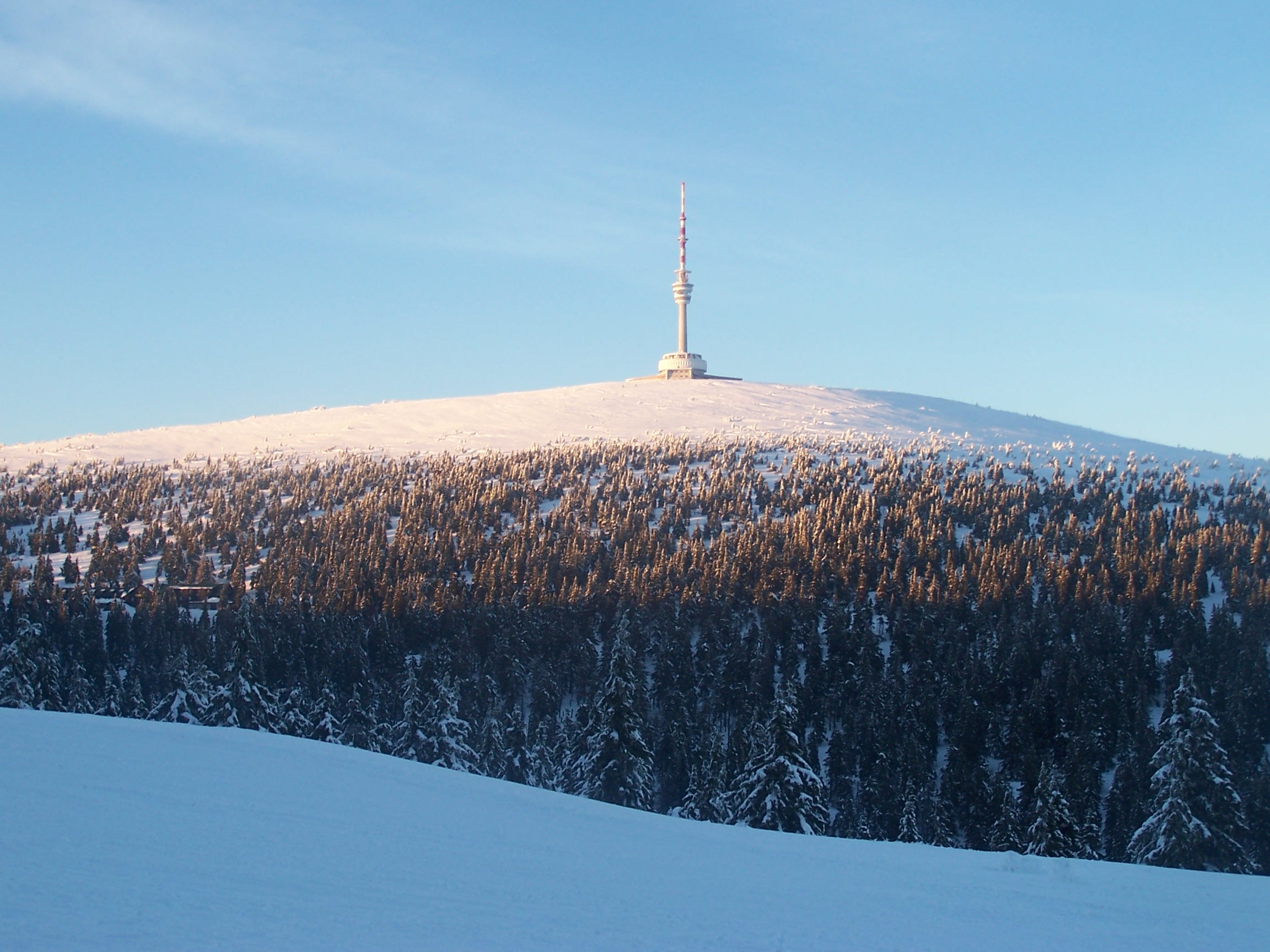
TV and observation tower on summit of Praděd

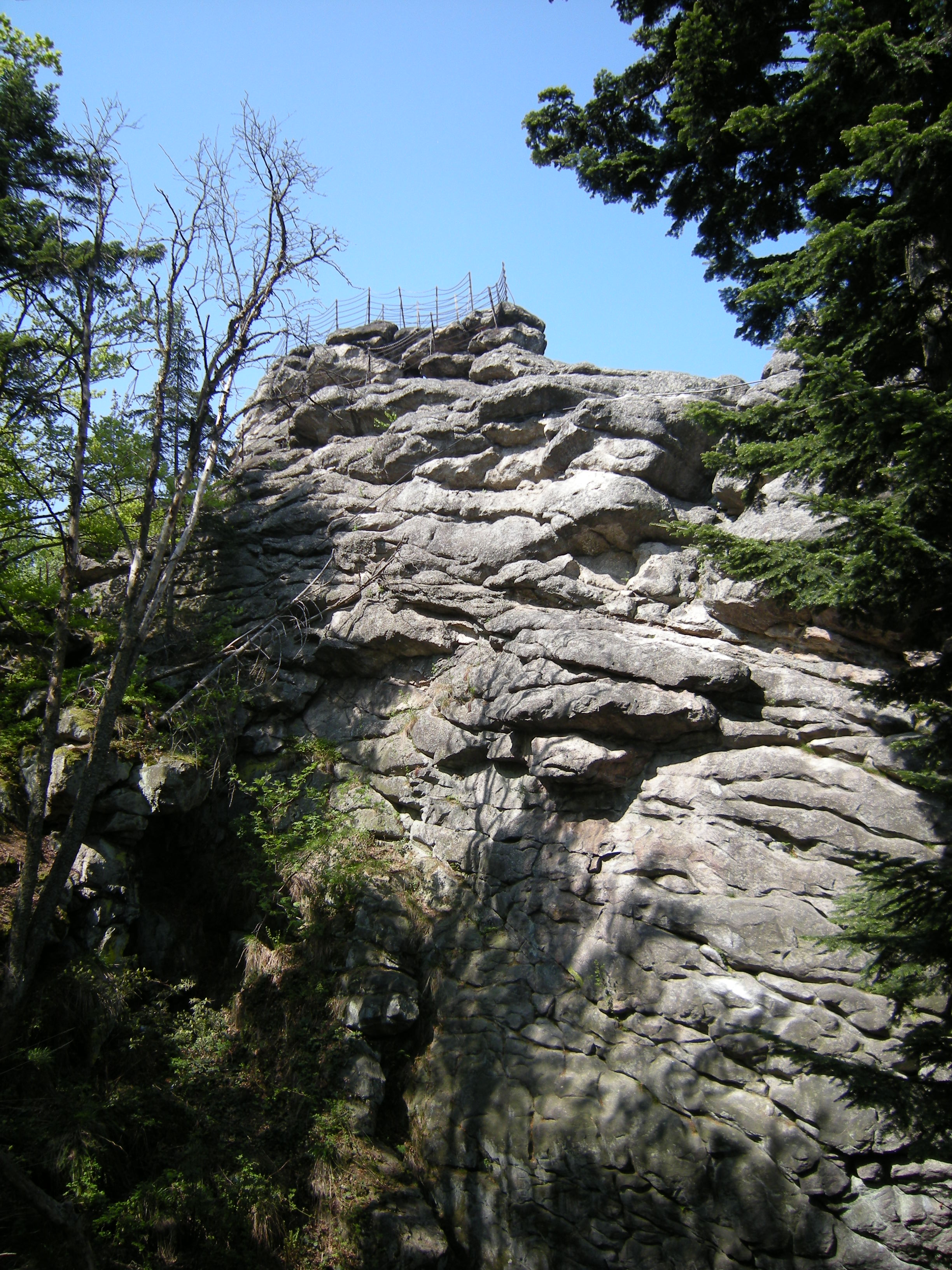
Čertovy kameny

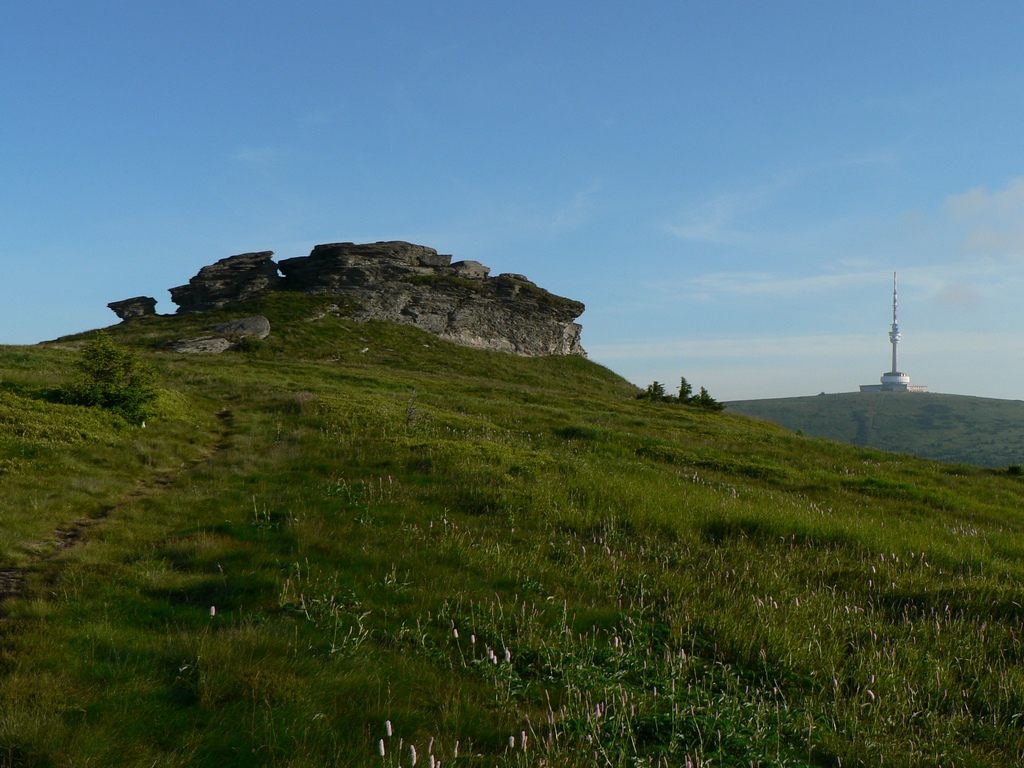
Petrovy kameny
