= Engelberg (disambiguation) =

Engelberg is a municipality in Switzerland.

Engelberg may also refer to:

== Places ==
- Engelberg Abbey in Engelberg, Switzerland
- Engelberg Abbey in Grossheubach, Bavaria
- Engelberg (Leonberg), a mountain in Baden-Württemberg, Germany
- Engelberg (bei Engelbach), a mountain in Hesse, Germany
- Engelberg Tunnel, a motorway in Germany

== Other uses ==
- Engelberg (surname)
- Engelberg (album), by Stephan Eicher
- Engelberg Huller Company

== See also ==
- Engelsberg (disambiguation)
