= Albert Schindler =

German painter

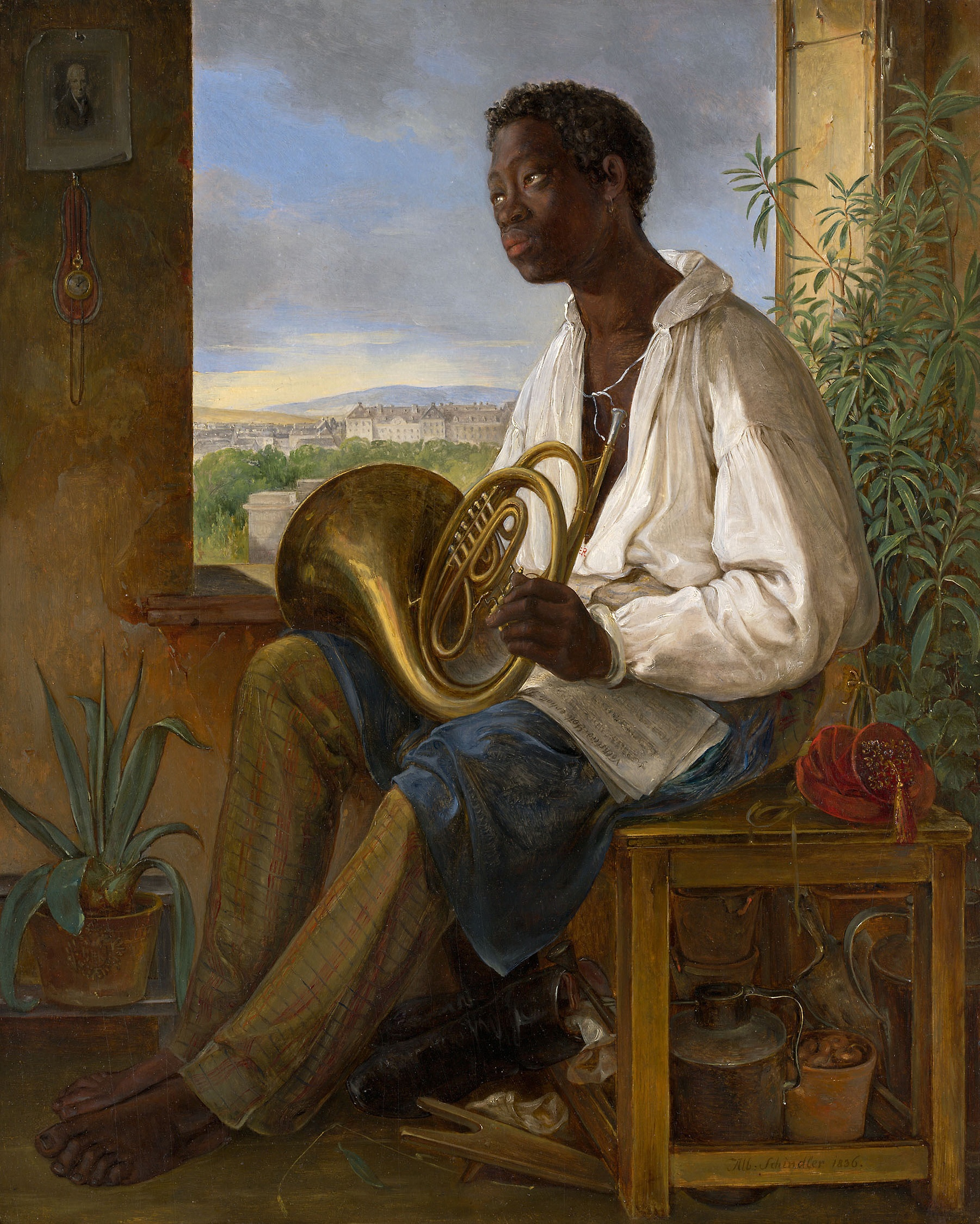
Gardener and Horn Player at the court of Emperor Francis I of Austria

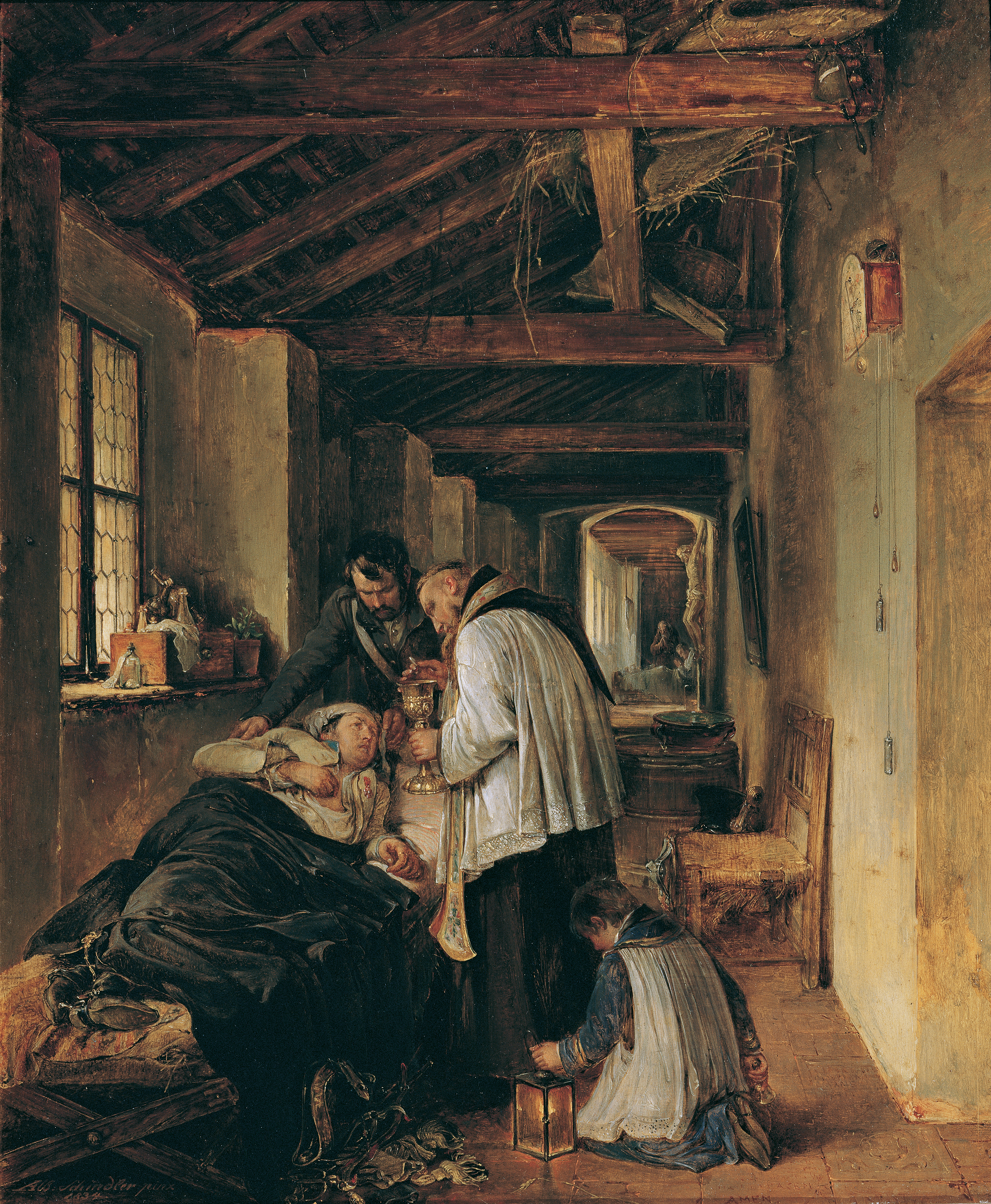
A Wounded Officer Given his Last Rites

Albert Schindler (19 August 1805, Andělská Hora – 3 May 1861, Vienna) was an Austrian painter and graphic artist in the Biedermeier style. His name was originally Albrecht.

== Biography ==
He was born to a poor family of weavers from Silesia. One day, when the Austrian artist, Peter Fendi, was travelling through the area, he discovered young Albrecht's drawing talents and persuaded his family to allow him to take the boy to Vienna with him. Fendi was unable to have children of his own, due to a childhood injury, and lived with his mother.

In addition to private lessons from Fendi, in 1827 he was enrolled at the Academy of Fine Arts. He effectively became a member of the Fendi family, joining two adopted nieces in their small apartment. Earlier, he had taken in two other young men with artistic talent; Friedrich Treml and Carl Schindler (no relation to Albert) and they still shared his studio. In 1832, he held his first exhibition at the academy.

Fendi had also trained him as a volunteer worker in the Imperial-Royal Münz- und Antikenkabinett (coin and antiquities collection/workshop) and, after Fendi's death in 1842, he took his place as draftsman and engraver. He also created cameos and a large set of medals depicting famous Austrians from the 16th-century to the present. This work occupied a great deal of his time and his artistic output decreased dramatically.

He was married twice; first to Antonia Barbara Birnegger, who died in 1849. Later, he married Maria Kappherr, who owned a house in the Laimgrube district. He died there in 1861, aged fifty-six.
