= Anton Strassgschwandtner =

Austrian painter and lithographer (1821–1886)

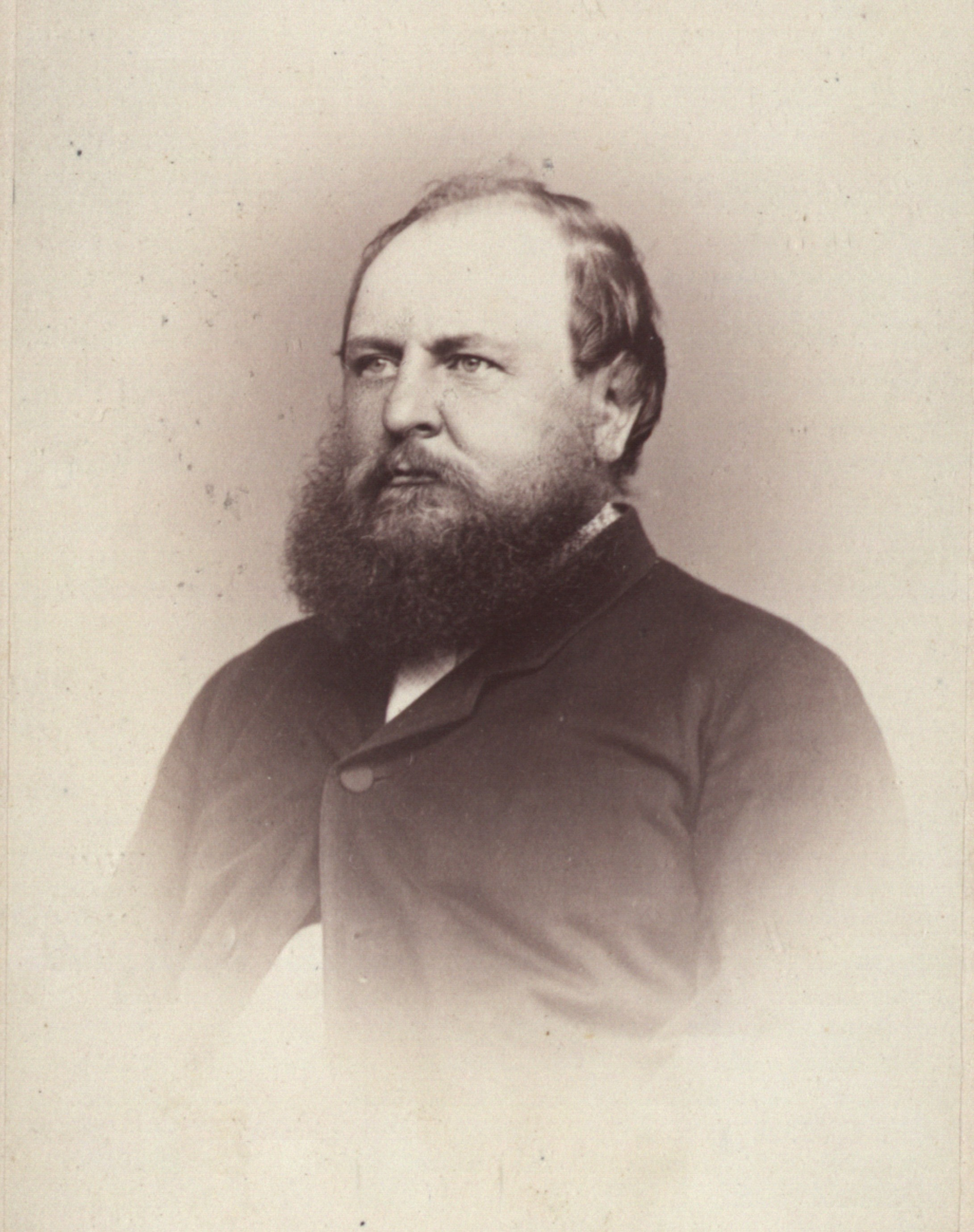
- Photograph of Strassgschwandtner by Hermann Klee, c. 1870
- Born: 17 October 1826; Vienna, Austrian Empire
- Died: 3 May 1881 (aged 54); Vienna, Austria-Hungary

Josef Anton Strassgschwandtner (17 October 1826 – 3 May 1881) was an Austrian painter and lithographer, who specialized in hunting, military and genre scenes.

== Biography ==
Strassgschwandtner was born on 17 October 1826, in Vienna. His father was a leather merchant. He was orphaned at an early age, and his artistic talent was discovered while he was still in the orphanage. From 1843 to 1845, he studied at the Academy of Fine Arts Vienna, under the direction of Leopold Kupelwieser and Franz Steinfeld. He was also influenced by August von Pettenkofen, Carl Schindler and contemporary French military lithographers. As a result, he was sometimes referred to as the "Austrian Raffet", after the French lithographer, Auguste Raffet.

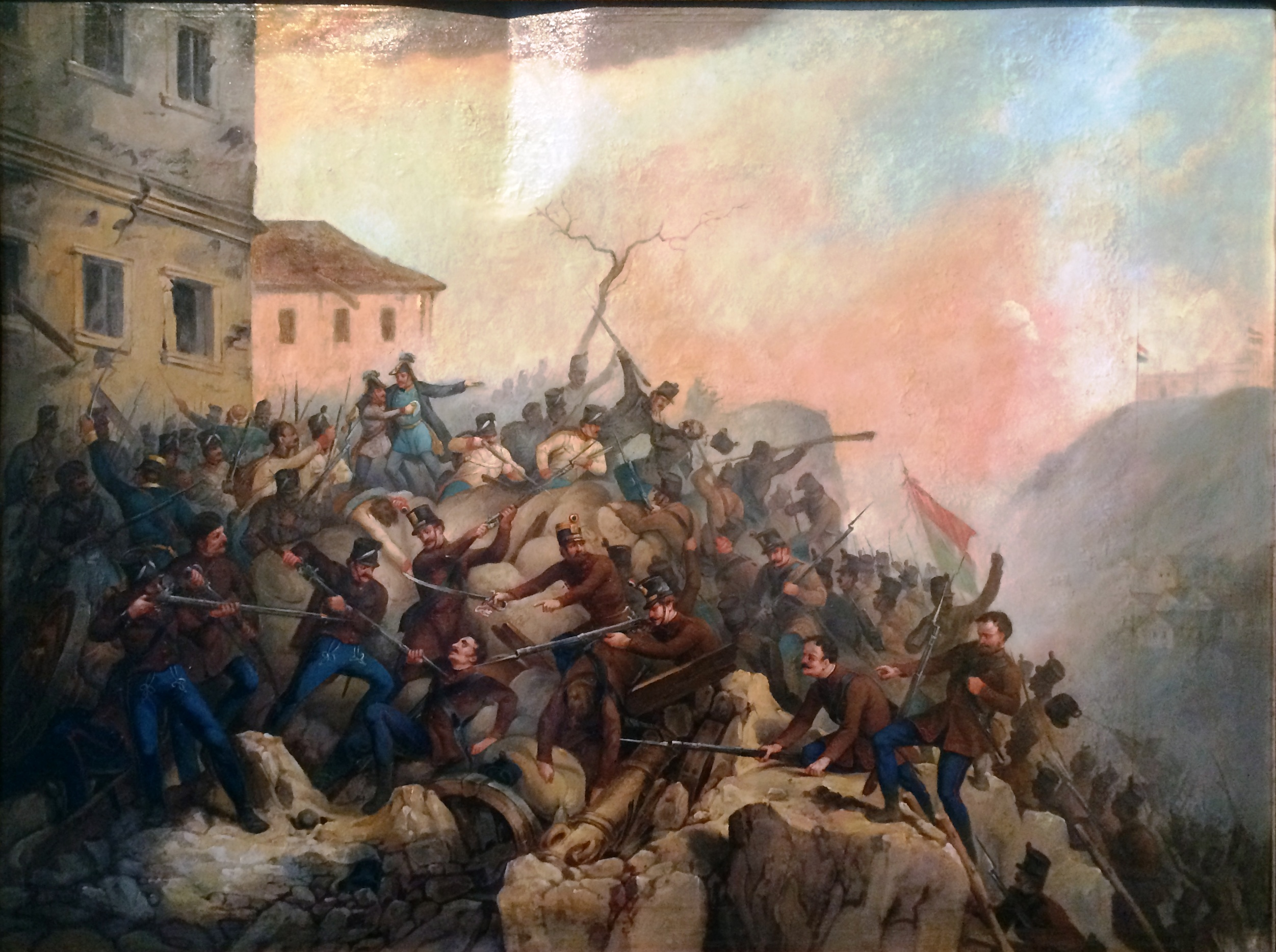
The Siege of Buda

He had his first exhibition in 1846 and would continue to have showings on a regular basis for the rest of his life. The events of 1848 gave an impetus to his interest in military painting, which would become his specialty, although he is also known for hunting scenes. His clients included hunting associations and horse lovers, as well as the Common Army and the usual wealthy individuals. In 1869, he became a member of the "Genossenschaft der bildenden Kunstler" (Vienna Künstlerhaus).

In 1879, he became mentally deranged and was committed to an asylum. He died on 3 May 1881, in Vienna, leaving a large collection of arms and military antiques.

In 1889, a street, the "Straßgschwandtnerstraße", was dedicated to him in the Penzing district of Vienna.
