= Engelsberg (disambiguation) =

Engelsberg may refer to:

- Engelsberg Ironworks (Swedish: Engelsbergs bruk), an ironworks in Ängelsberg, Sweden
- Engelsberg-Norbergs Railway

== Place names ==
- Engelsberg, a municipality in Bavaria, Germany
- the German name for:
  - Andělská Hora (Bruntál District), Czech Republic
  - Andělská Hora (Karlovy Vary District), Czech Republic
- the former name of Kalbar, Queensland, Australia

== Family names ==
- E.S. Engelsberg (1825–1879), a Silesian-Austrian composer

== See also ==
- Ängelsberg
- Engelberg (disambiguation)
- Engelsburg (disambiguation)
