= Jursitzky =

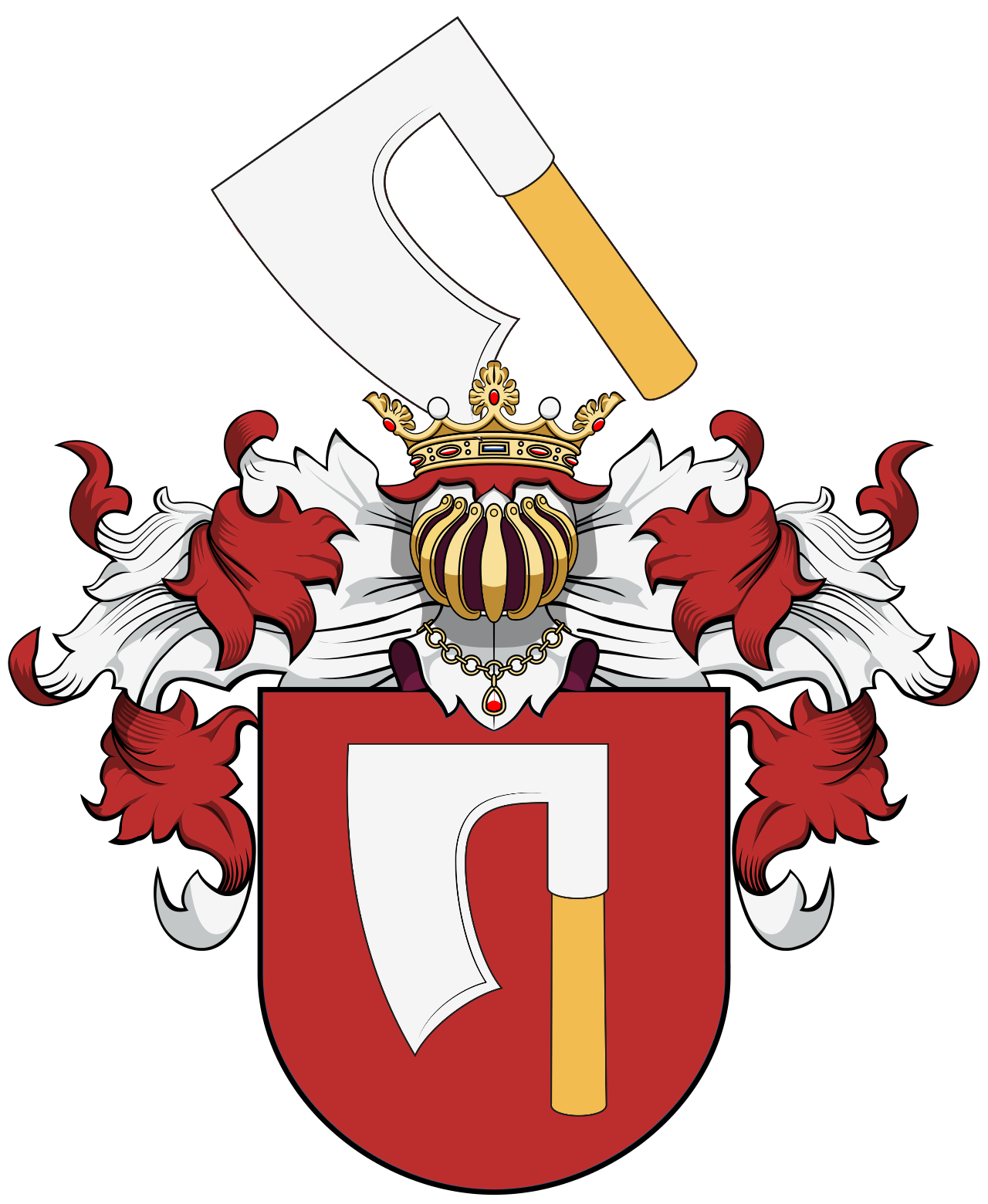
Topór coat of arms, used by Jursitzky family

The Jursitzky family (or Jurczycki) is the name of an ancient Polish noble family. In 1404, Watzlaw Jursitzky was registered in the Kraków coat of arms as a member of the Topór clan.

== Coat of arms ==
The Topór coat of arms was used by the Jursitzky family. Some family members used the Nowina, Strzemię, and the Radwan coat of arms.

== Name ==
The ancient name "Jurczycki z Jurczyc" derives from the first name Georg (Slavic: "Juri"); it means sons of Georg (The "ki" at the end of the name means "son of"). Over time, due to political changes and migration in Silesia, the Germanised versions of Jurczycki and Jursitzky came into use. Over the time, the family also became part of the German and Austrian nobility.

== History ==
The family's first ancestral seat was in Jurczyce, Lesser Poland Voivodeship, part of the village of Skawina in Poland, near Kraków. Like many other Polish noble families, the Jursitzkys were impoverished in the 17th century. The house in Jurczyce was sold in 1795 to the Haller family. The Polish general Józef Haller was born in Jurczyce Manor.

== Notable members ==
- Moritz Jursitzky (1861–1936), Austrian writer
- Wilhelm Jursitzky (1896–1944) (executed), Austrian resistance fighter
- Bruno Jursitzky (1898–1944) (executed), Austrian resistance fighter
