= Engelsburg =

Engelsburg (German for Angel's Castle) may refer to:

- the former name of Pokrzywno, Grudziądz County, Poland
- the former name of Kalbar, Queensland, Australia
- the German name for Castel Sant'Angelo, a historical building in Rome

== See also ==
- Engelsberg (disambiguation)
