= August von Pettenkofen =

Austrian painter (1822–1889)

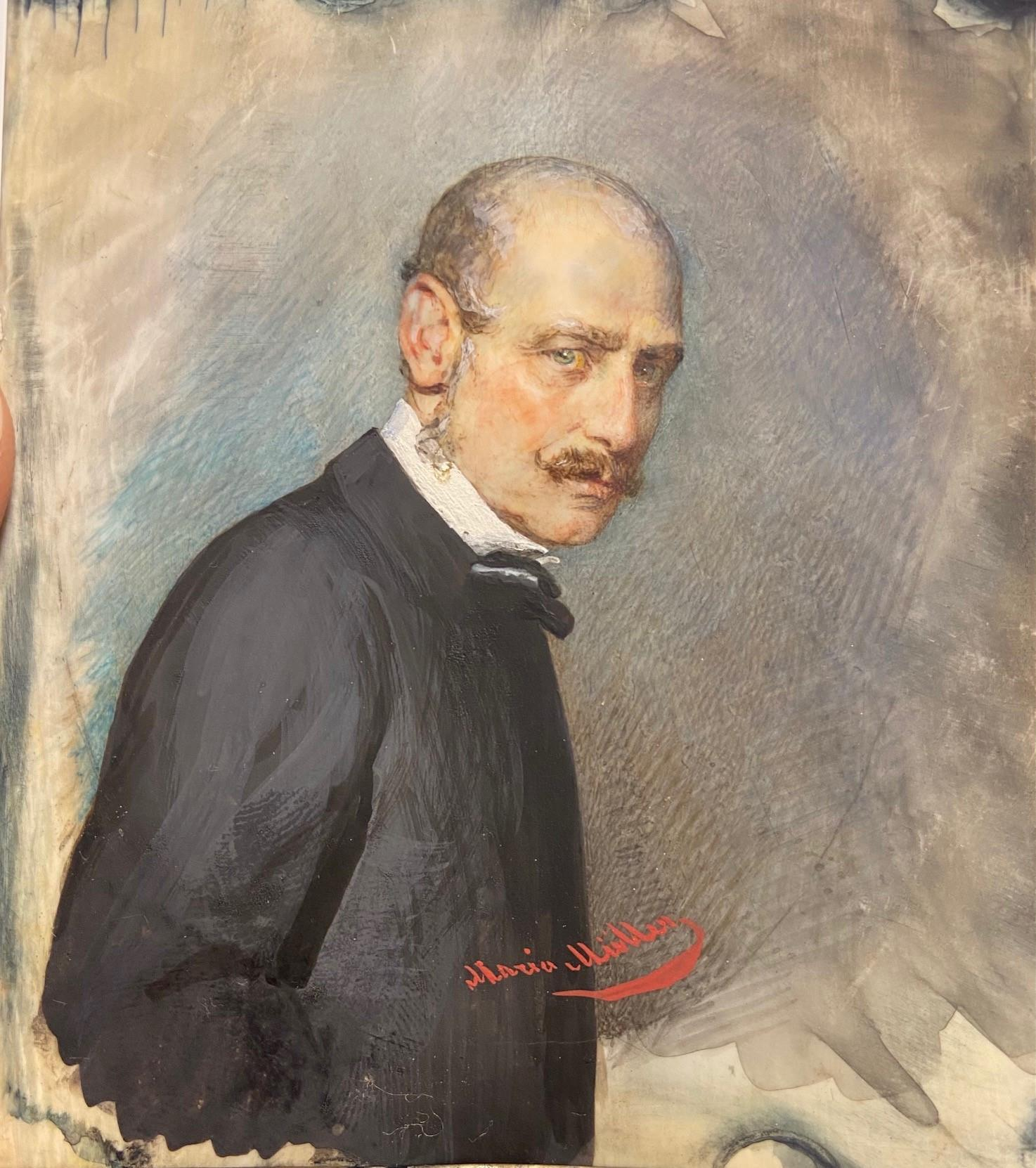
August von Pettenkofen; portrait by Marie Müller

August von Pettenkofen (10 May 1822 – 21 March 1889) was an Austrian painter.

== Biography ==
Pettenkofen was born in Vienna; his father was a merchant and landowner. He grew up on his father's estate in Galitzia. After his father's death, he grew up with the family of his cousin Ferdinand von Saar in Vienna. In 1834, giving up a military career, he became a student at the Academy of Fine Arts, where he studied with Leopold Kupelwieser and Franz Eybl. At this time, he painted genre works in typical Biedermeier style.

During the Revolutions of 1848, he became a military painter in the style of Carl Schindler. While performing his duties, he spent some time in Szolnok, Hungary; an area which left a great impression on him and led to his style becoming more picturesque. In 1852, he went to Paris and came under the influence of the Barbizon school. His paintings are recognized for the sincerity with which the artist depicts the uneventful melancholy life of Hungarian peasants and gypsies, without any theatrical pathos or forced humour.

He was admitted as a member of the Vienna Academy in 1866 and, in 1872, became an honorary member of the Academy of Fine Arts, Munich. In 1876, he was knighted. Between 1870 and 1880, he took annual trips to Venice. He died at the "Sanatorium Loew" in Vienna in 1889. That same year, a street in Landstraße was named after him. In 1893, he was buried in a grave of honor (German: Ehrengrab), designed by Viktor Tilgner, at the Zentralfriedhof.

== Selected paintings ==
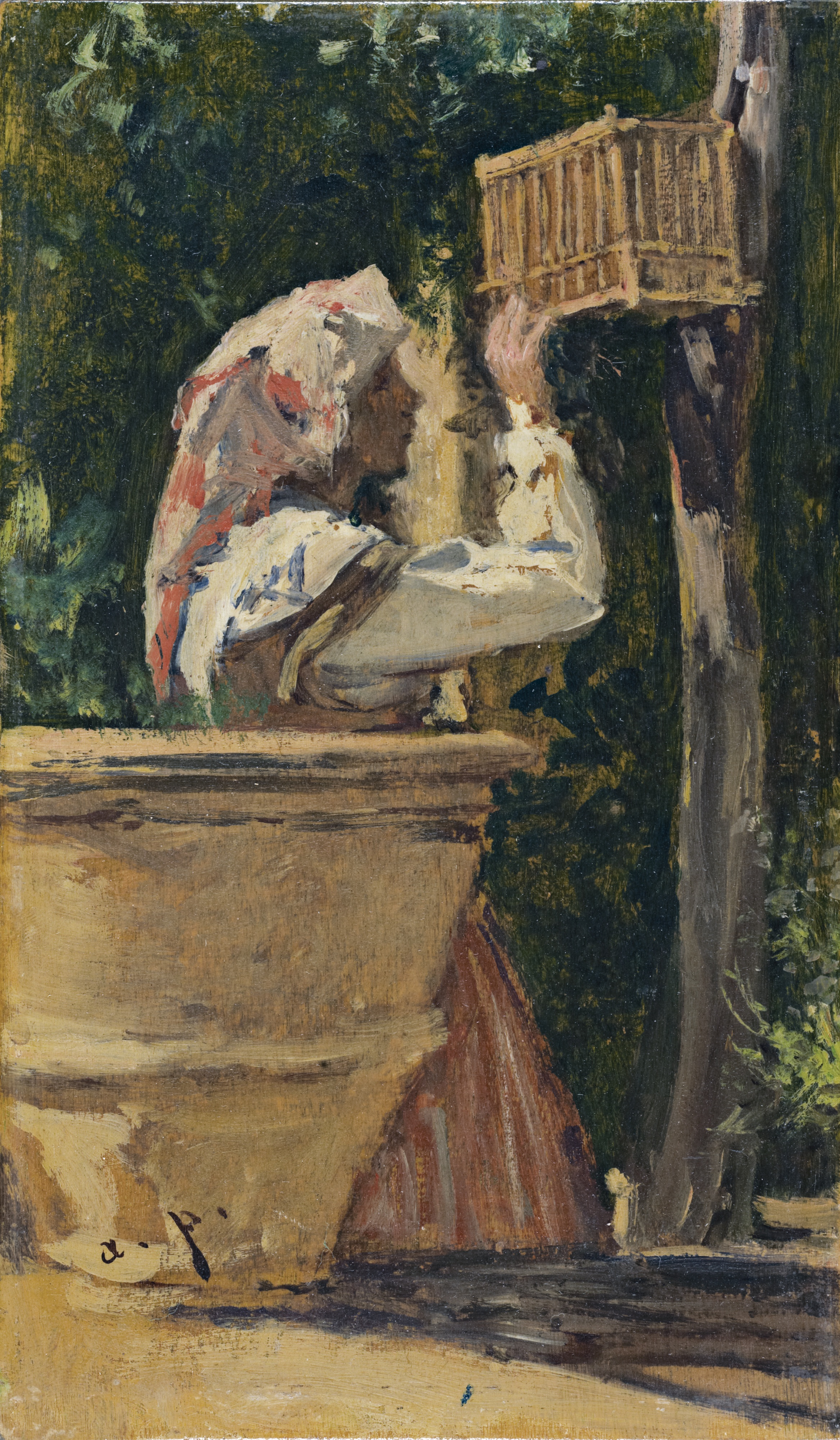
The Birdcage

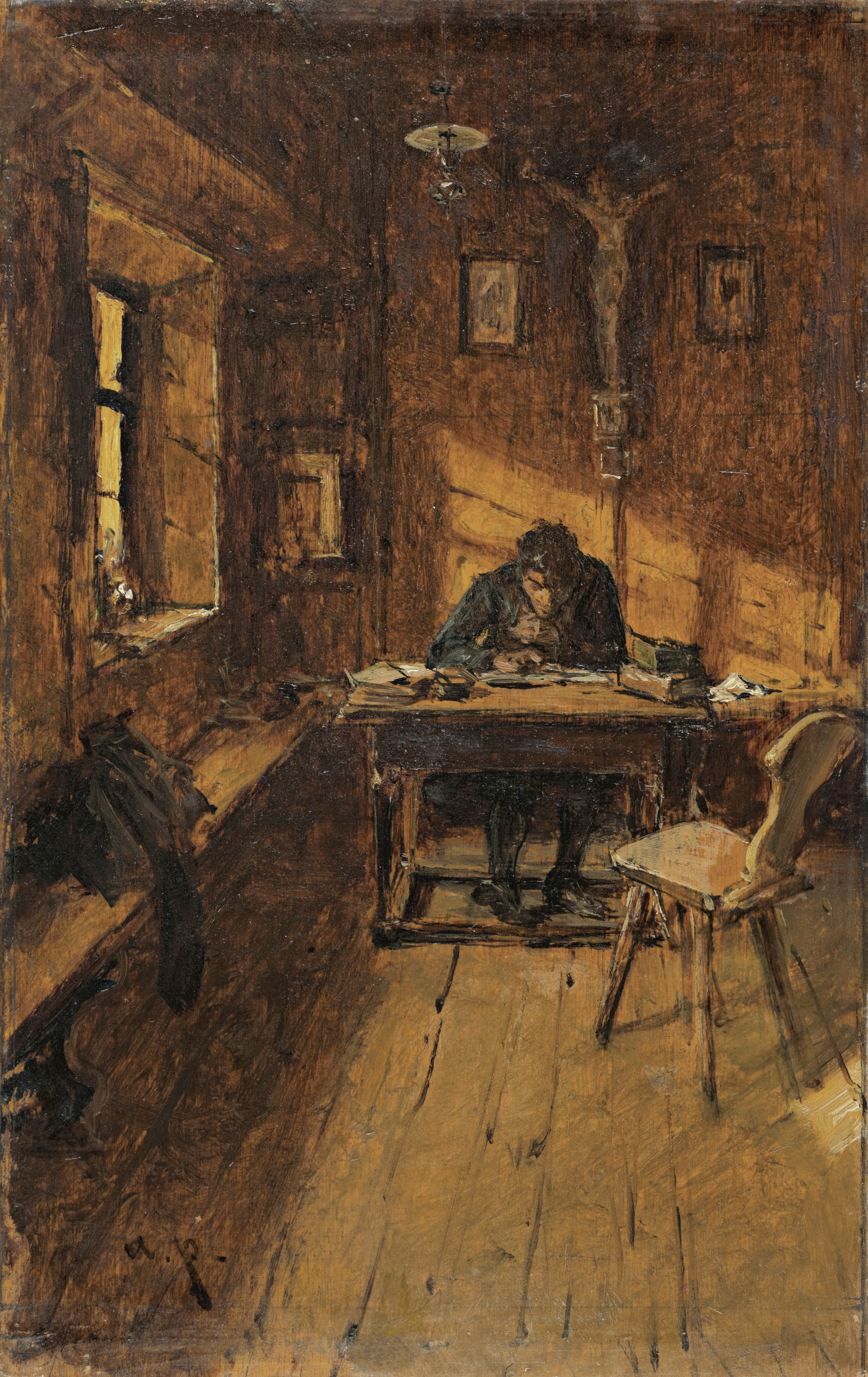
The Village Scribe

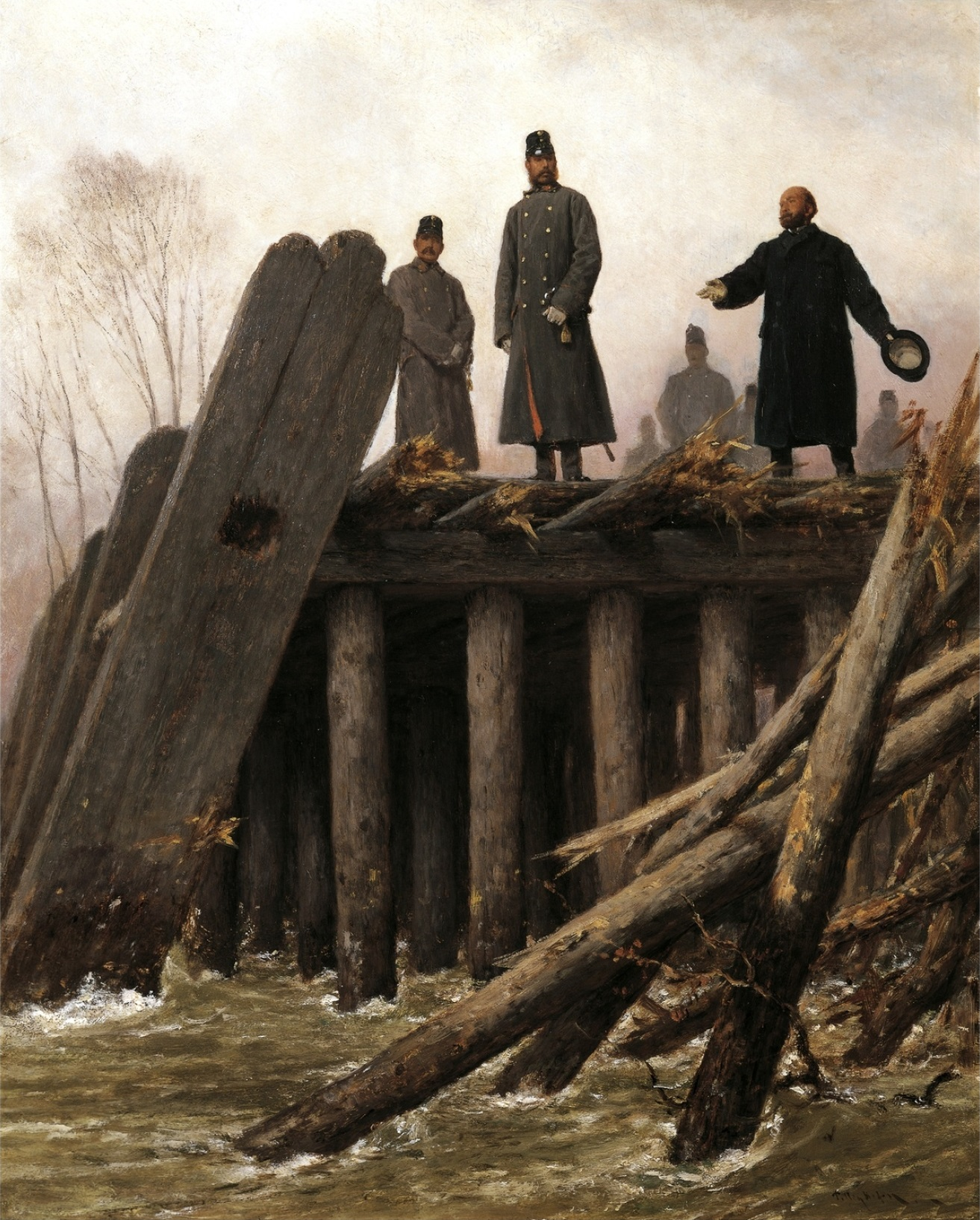
Emperor Franz Joseph at the Taborbrücke

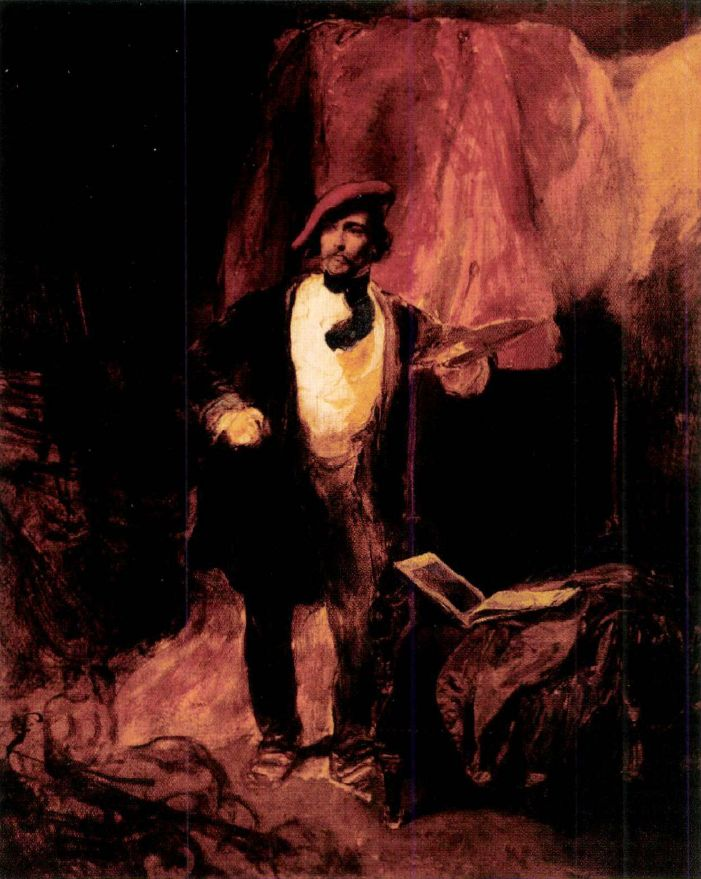
Portrait of József Borsos

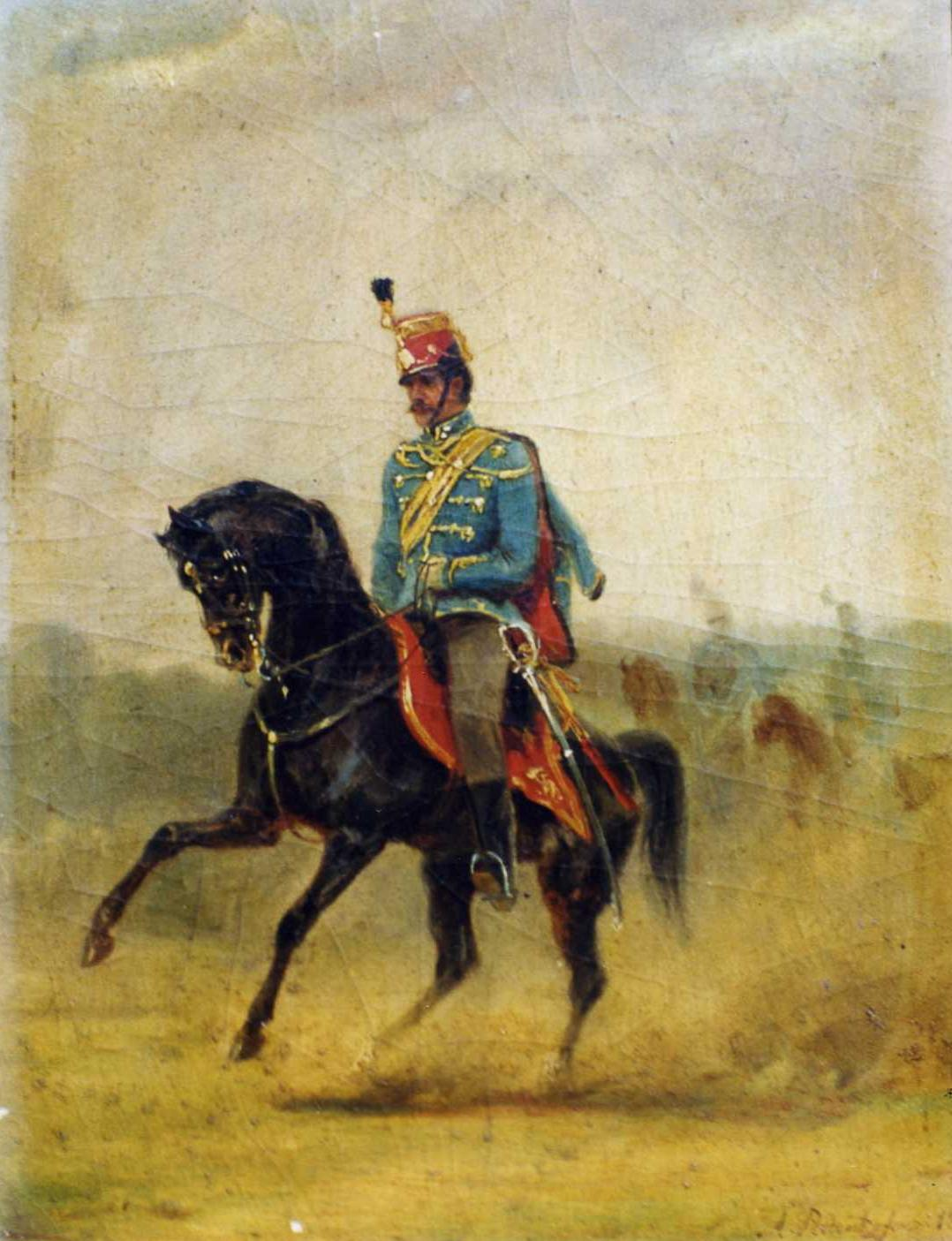
Hungarian Hussar

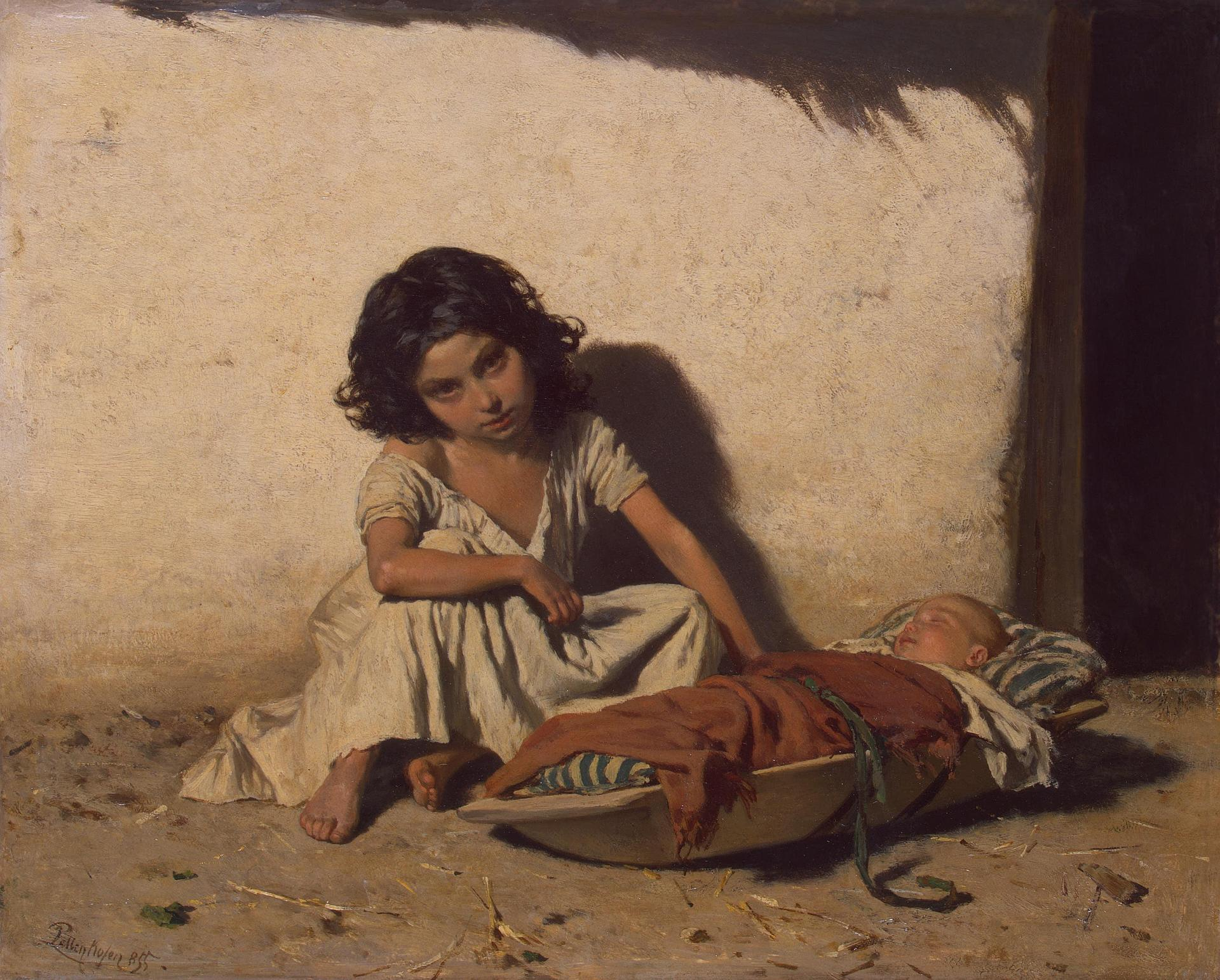
Gypsy Children

== Sources ==
- Arpad Weixlgärtner (1907). "Pettenkofen, August Ritter von". Allgemeine Deutsche Biographie (in German). Vol. 53. Leipzig: Duncker & Humblot. pp. 32–35.
- * R. Mikula: "Pettenkofer (Pettenkofen) August von". In: Österreichisches Biographisches Lexikon 1815–1950 (ÖBL). Vol. 8, Austrian Academy of Sciences, Vienna 1983, ISBN 3-7001-0187-2, p. 11.
