= Engelberger =

Engelberger is a German surname. Notable people with the surname include:

- John Engelberger (born 1976), German-American footballer
- Joseph Engelberger (1925–2015), American engineer and businessman

== See also ==
- Engelberg (surname)
