= Engelberg (surname) =

Engelberg is a German-language surname.

== Geographical distribution ==
As of 2014, 29.3% of all known bearers of the surname Engelberg were residents of Germany (frequency 1:111,120), 25.1% of the United States (1:583,605), 12.6% of Brazil (1:659,717), 10.0% of Israel (1:34,957), 4.5% of Canada (1:331,514), 3.5% of Norway (1:60,498), 2.4% of Sweden (1:169,772), 2.1% of Finland (1:105,708), 1.5% of Poland (1:1,000,231), 1.5% of Denmark (1:152,555), 1.5% of Belgium (1:319,372), 1.3% of South Africa (1:1,686,704) and 1.3% of Argentina (1:1,378,823).

In Germany, the frequency of the surname was higher than national average (1:111,120) in the following states:

1. Mecklenburg-Vorpommern (1:23,299)
2. Bremen (1:36,604)
3. Hamburg (1:50,431)
4. North Rhine-Westphalia (1:58,880)
5. Saxony-Anhalt (1:64,611)
6. Lower Saxony (1:88,861)
7. Schleswig-Holstein (1:93,474)

== People ==
- Evaristo Conrado Engelberg (1853–1932), Brazilian mechanical engineer and inventor
- Miriam Engelberg (1958–2006), graphic novelist and illustrator
- Amy and Wendy Engelberg, American television writing and producing team
- Sydney Engelberg (1948–present), Israeli professor famous for calming a students crying baby while teaching

== See also ==
- Engelberger
- Engelsberg (disambiguation)
