= Engelberg (near Engelbach) =

Coordinates: 50°55′48″N 8°36′32″E

Highest point
- Elevation: 422 m (1,385 ft)

Geography
- Location: Hesse, Germany

The Engelberg is a hill of Hesse, Germany.
