= Friedrich Treml =

Austrian genre painter and Watercolorist

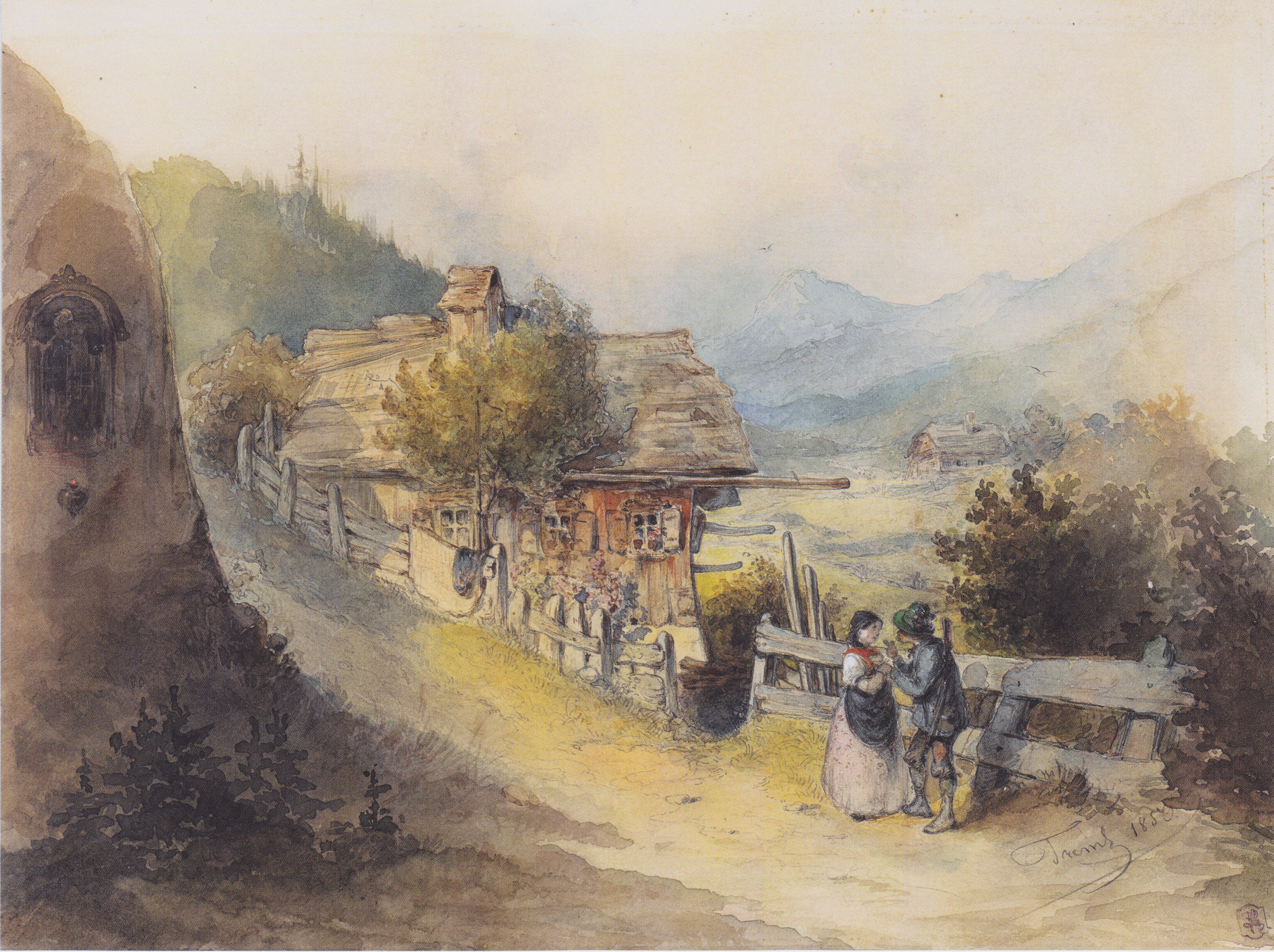
Encounter in the Mountains

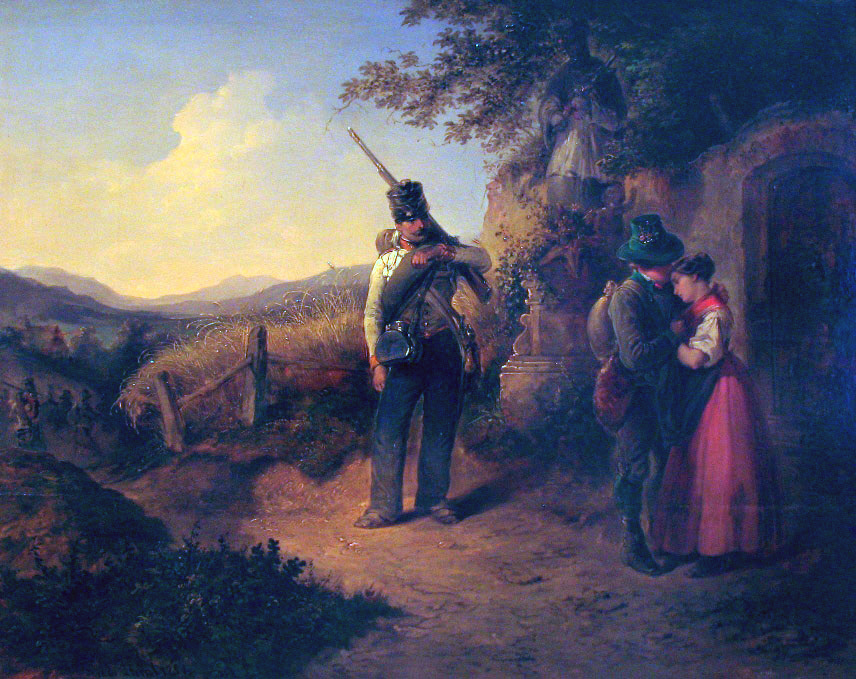
The Recruit's Farewell

Friedrich Treml, full name: Johann Friedrich Treml, (8 January 1816, Vienna - 13 June 1852, Vienna) was an Austrian genre painter and Watercolorist.

== Life and work ==
He was the son of Friedrich Anton Treml, a theater painter, and his wife, Theresia Barbara Bondra, an opera singer. Johann Nepomuk Hummel was his godfather.

After a brief period of study at the Vienna Polytechnical School, he transferred to the Academy of Fine Arts, where his instructors included Josef Klieber and Leopold Kupelwieser. He received special encouragement from Peter Fendi. In 1843 he married Franziska Konopasek, Fendi's cousin and adopted daughter.

He painted genre scenes, with a special focus on military subjects. After 1849 he worked almost exclusively for the Viennese court. His paintings were often reproduced as lithographs by Franz Josef Sandmann, Karl Lanzedelly (1815-1865), and Johann Stadler (1805-1859), among others. As a result, his works became very popular. In his choice of subjects and style, he was heavily influenced by Carl Schindler.

He died of respiratory failure at his home, and was buried in Mödling Cemetery.

His works may be found in several museums, including the Museum of Military History and the Albertina, as well as museums in Salzburg and Munich.

A street in Vienna's Liesing district was named after him in 1959.

== Well-known paintings ==
- The Recruit's Farewell, 1851, oil on wood, 41 × 52 cm, Museum of Military History, Vienna
- Encounter in the Mountains, 1850, watercolor, 19 × 25,3 cm, private collection
