= József Borsos =

Hungarian portrait painter and photographer

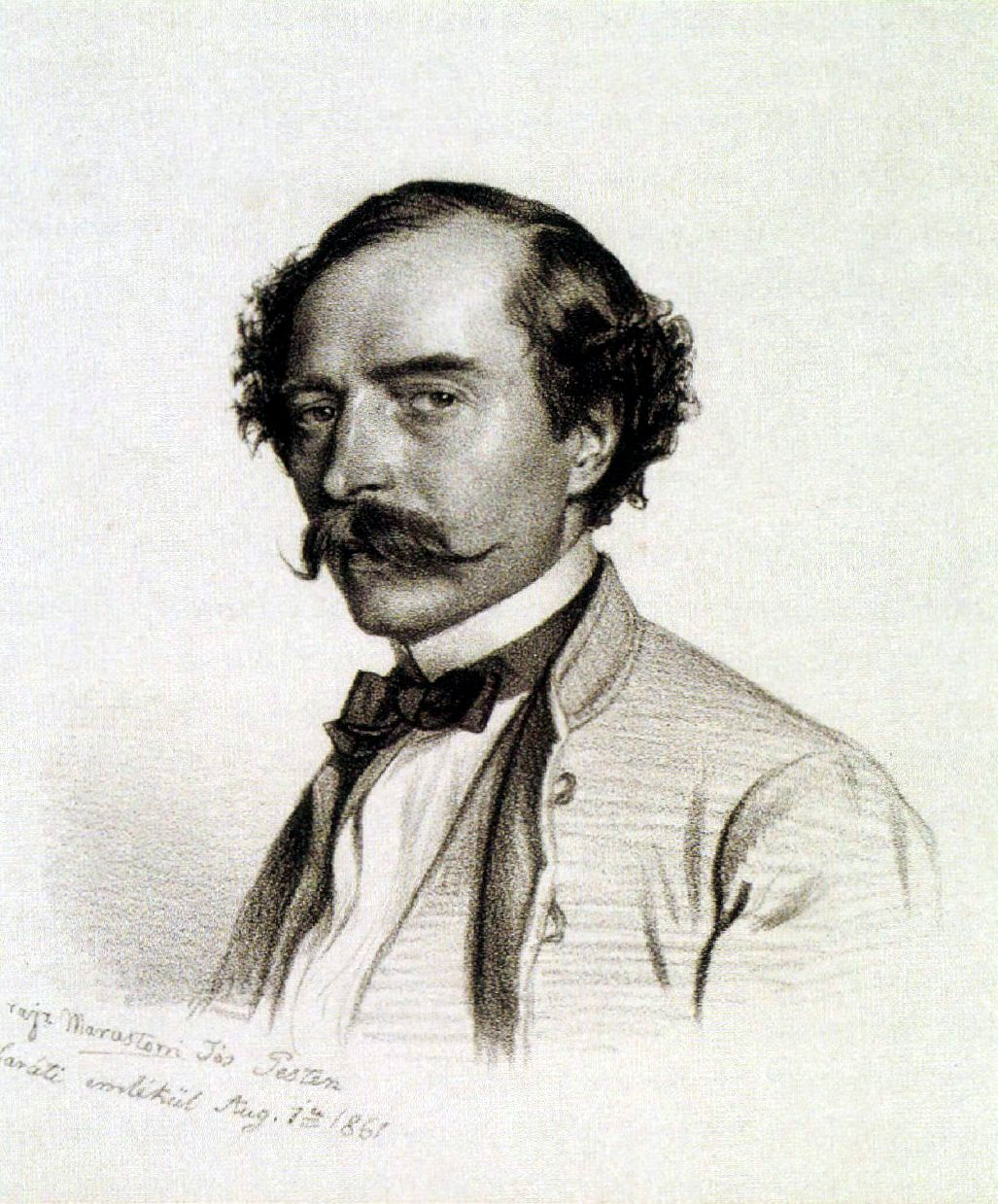
József Borsos; portrait by Josef Marastoni (1861)

József Borsos (21 December 1821, in Veszprém – 19 August 1883, in Budapest) was a Hungarian portrait painter and photographer; best known for his genre paintings in the Biedermeier style.

== Life and work ==
His father, Márton Borsos was a lawyer, editor and publisher. From 1837, he was a student of the religious artist, József Károly Schöfft, in Budapest. He transferred to the Academy of Fine Arts, Vienna in 1840, where he studied with Leopold Kupelwieser. In 1843, he changed schools again, attending a private academy operated by Ferdinand Georg Waldmüller.

He initially chose to live in Vienna, with a large clientele from the Austrian aristocracy. Financially successful, he lost most of his money speculating in the stock market, and returned to Pest in 1861. There, he chose to abandon painting and opened a photography studio, together with a painter and photographer known as Doctor Albert. Once again, he was able to accumulate a considerable fortune, but gave up photography and opened a restaurant, the "Szép Juhászné", which he ran for the rest of his life.

Many of his works are in private collections, but some may be seen at the Hungarian National Gallery.

== Gallery ==
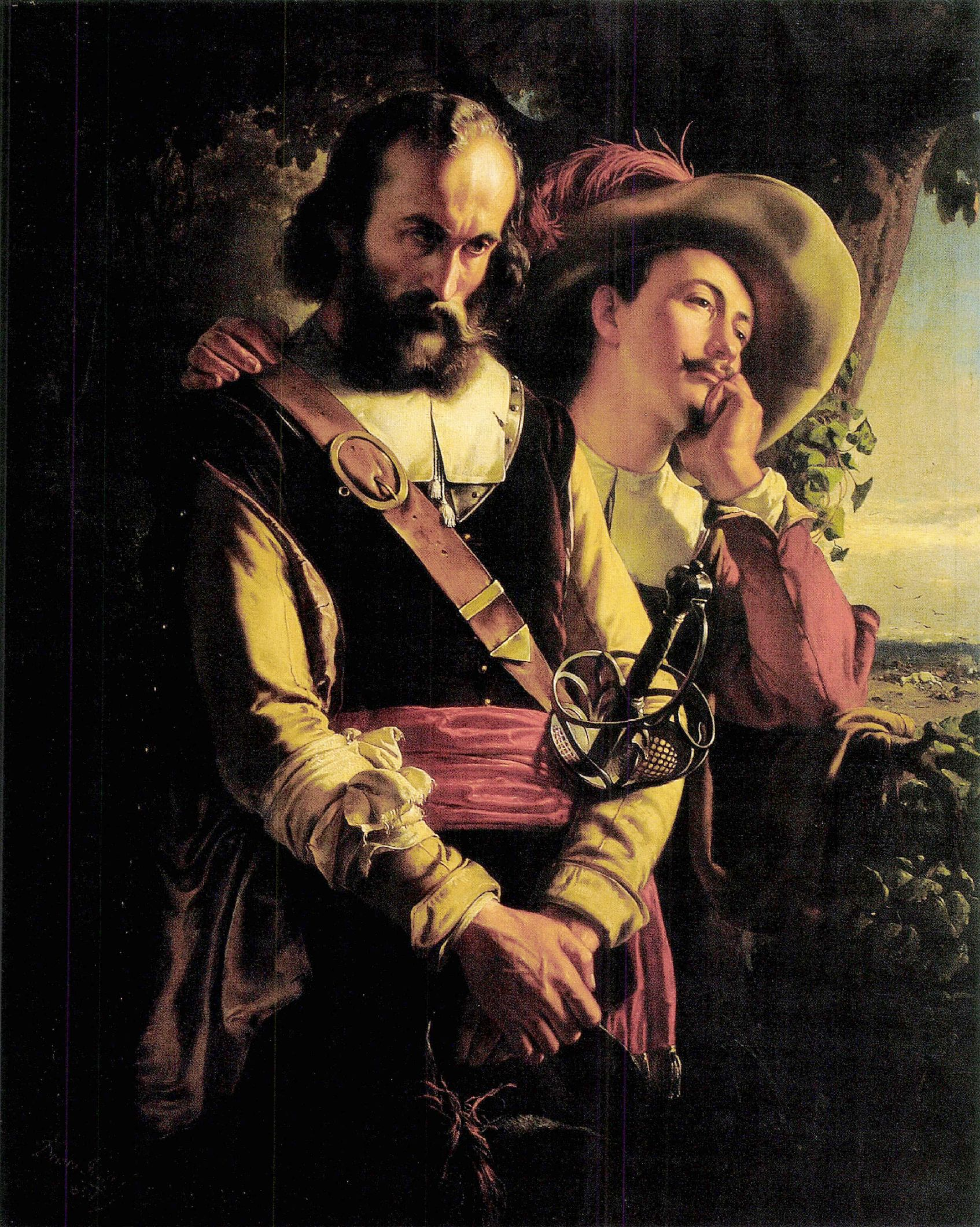
After the Battle, 1854

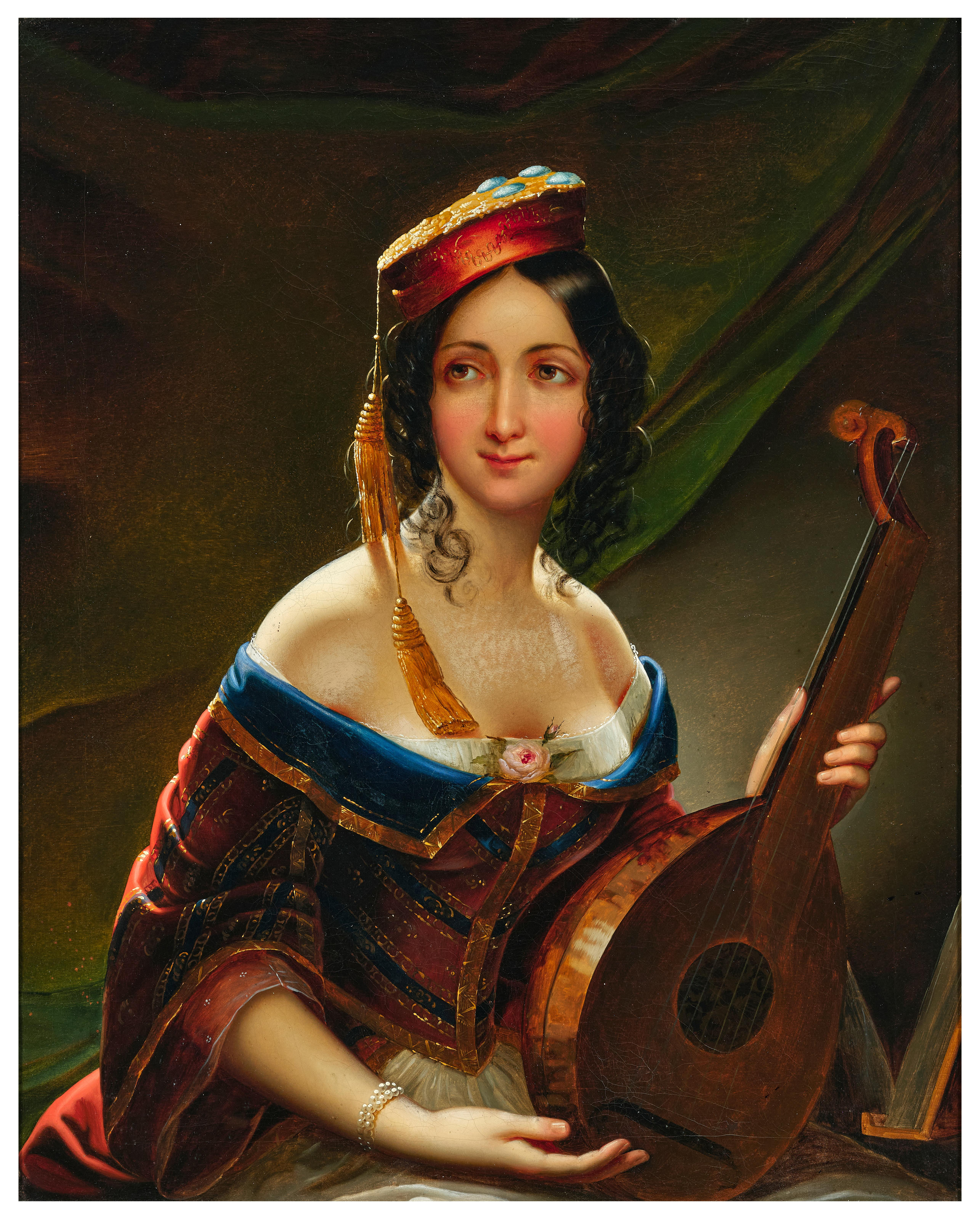
Lady with Mandolin

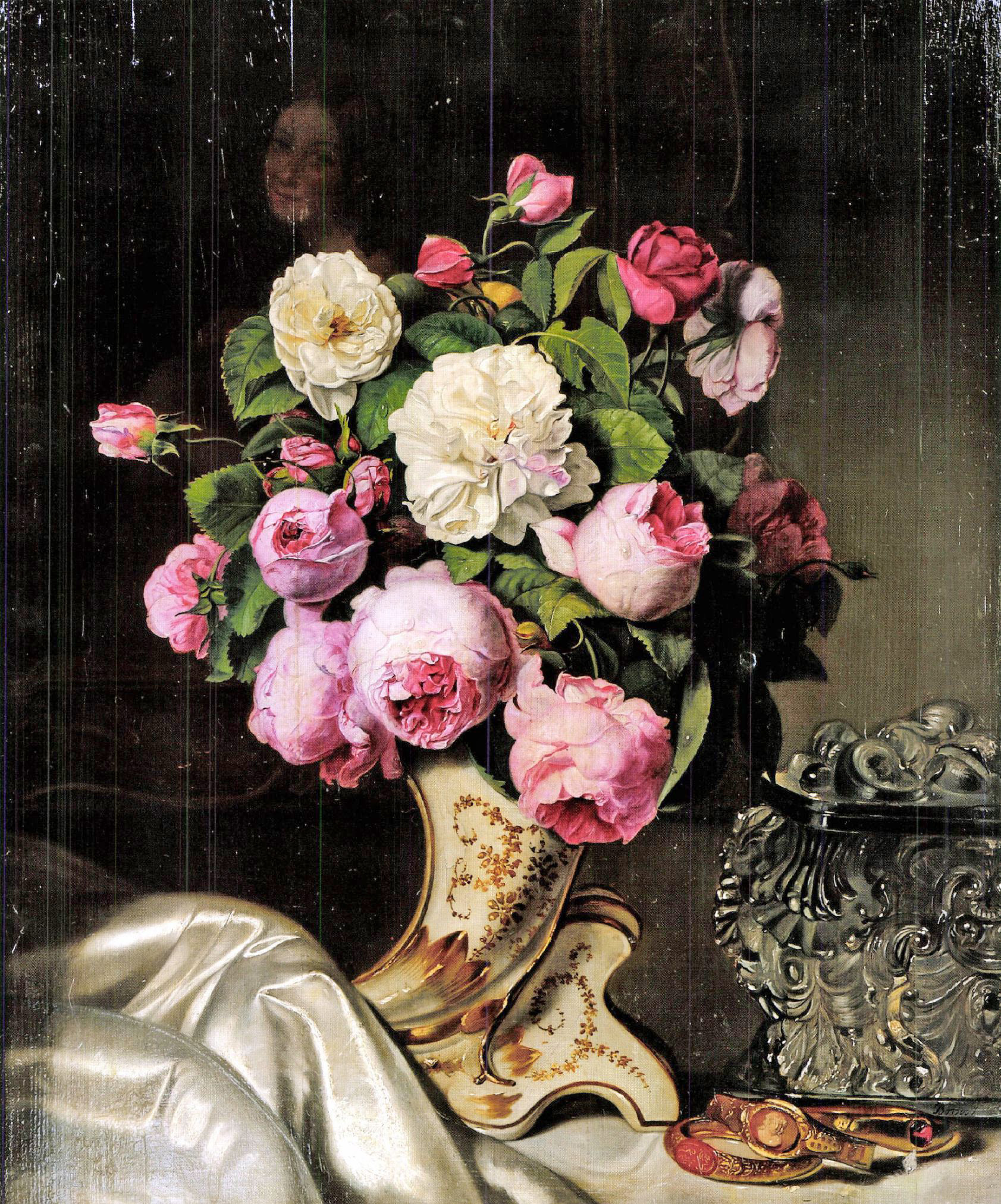
Still Life, 1840s

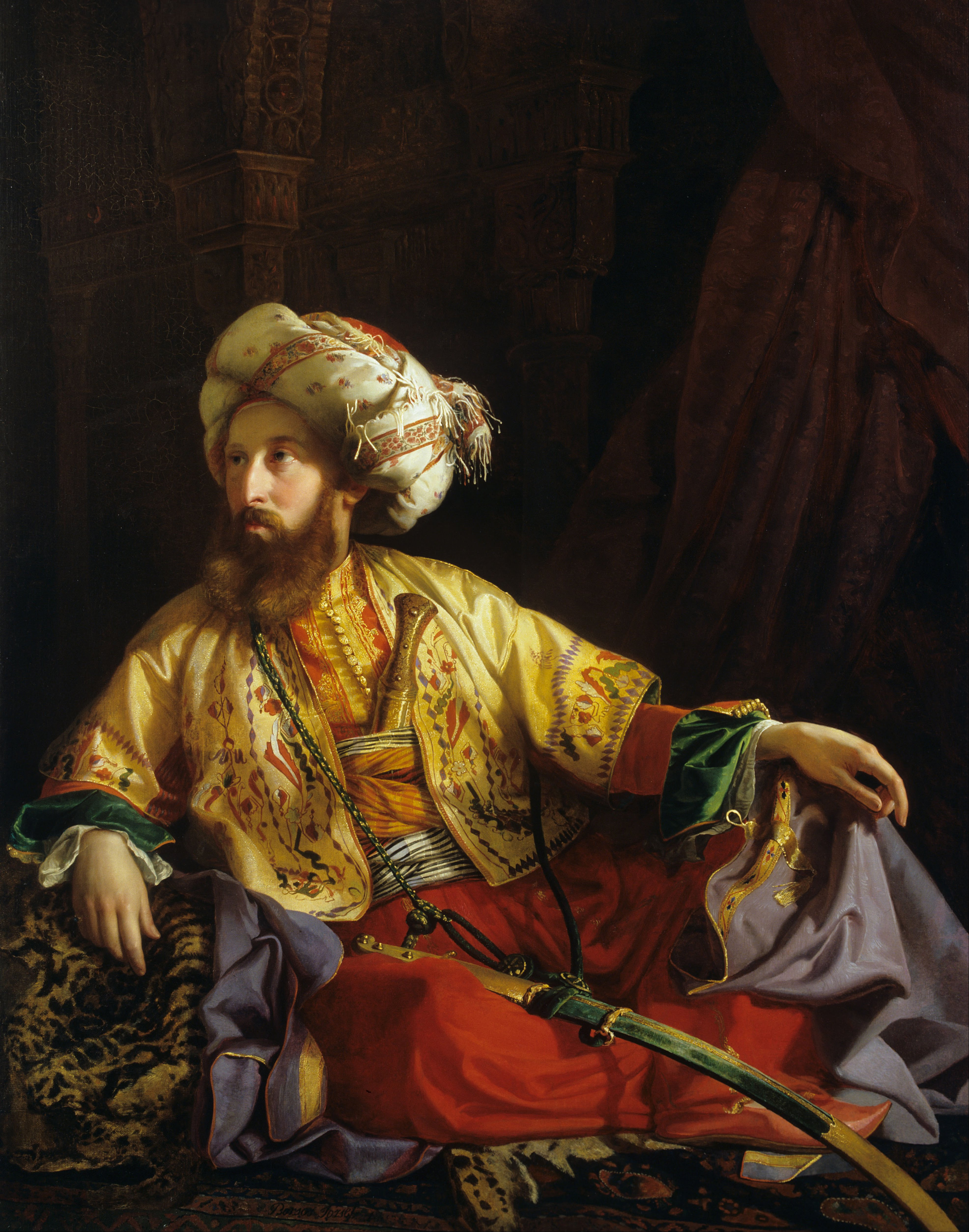
Emir of Lebanon, 1843

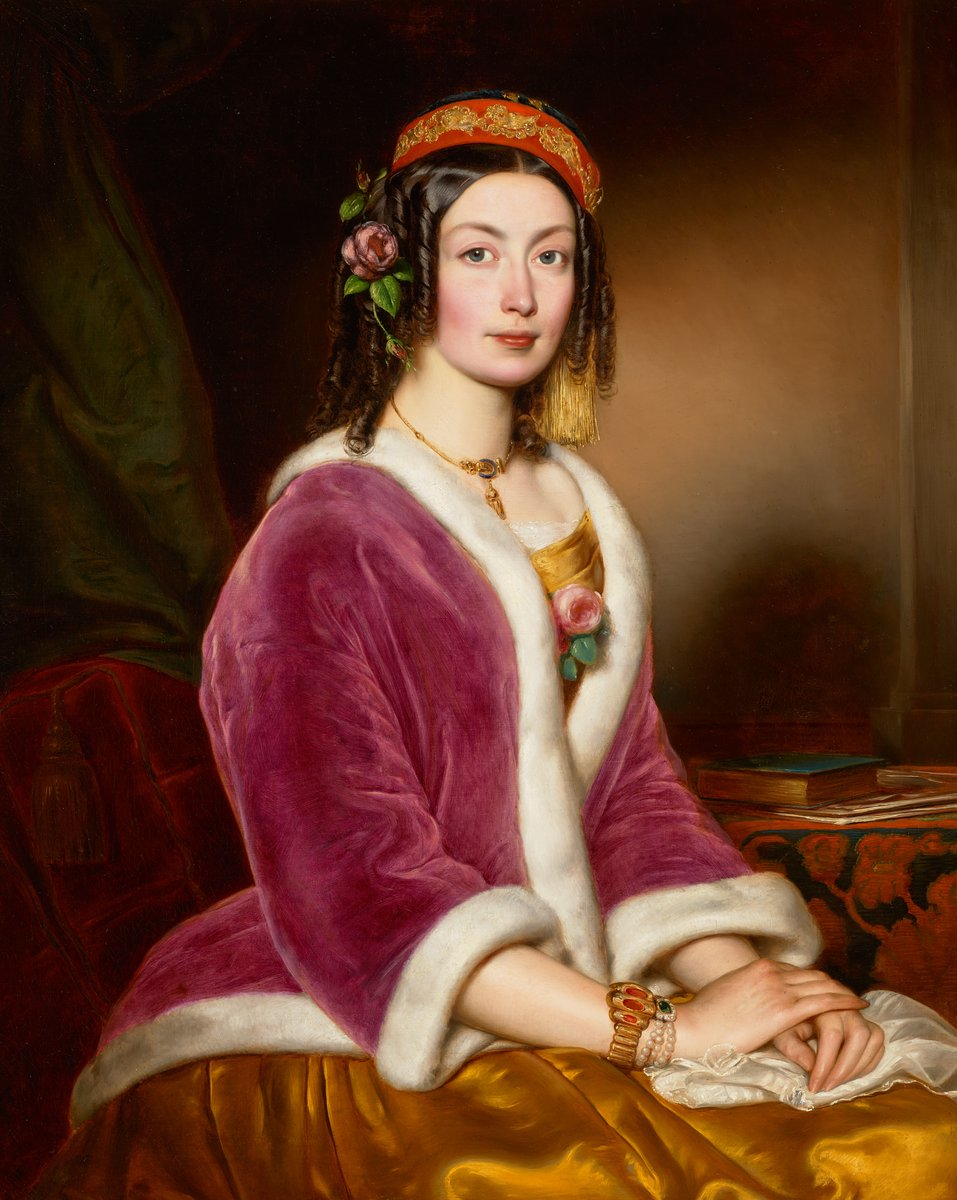
Woman Wearing a Velvet Pelisse, 1850

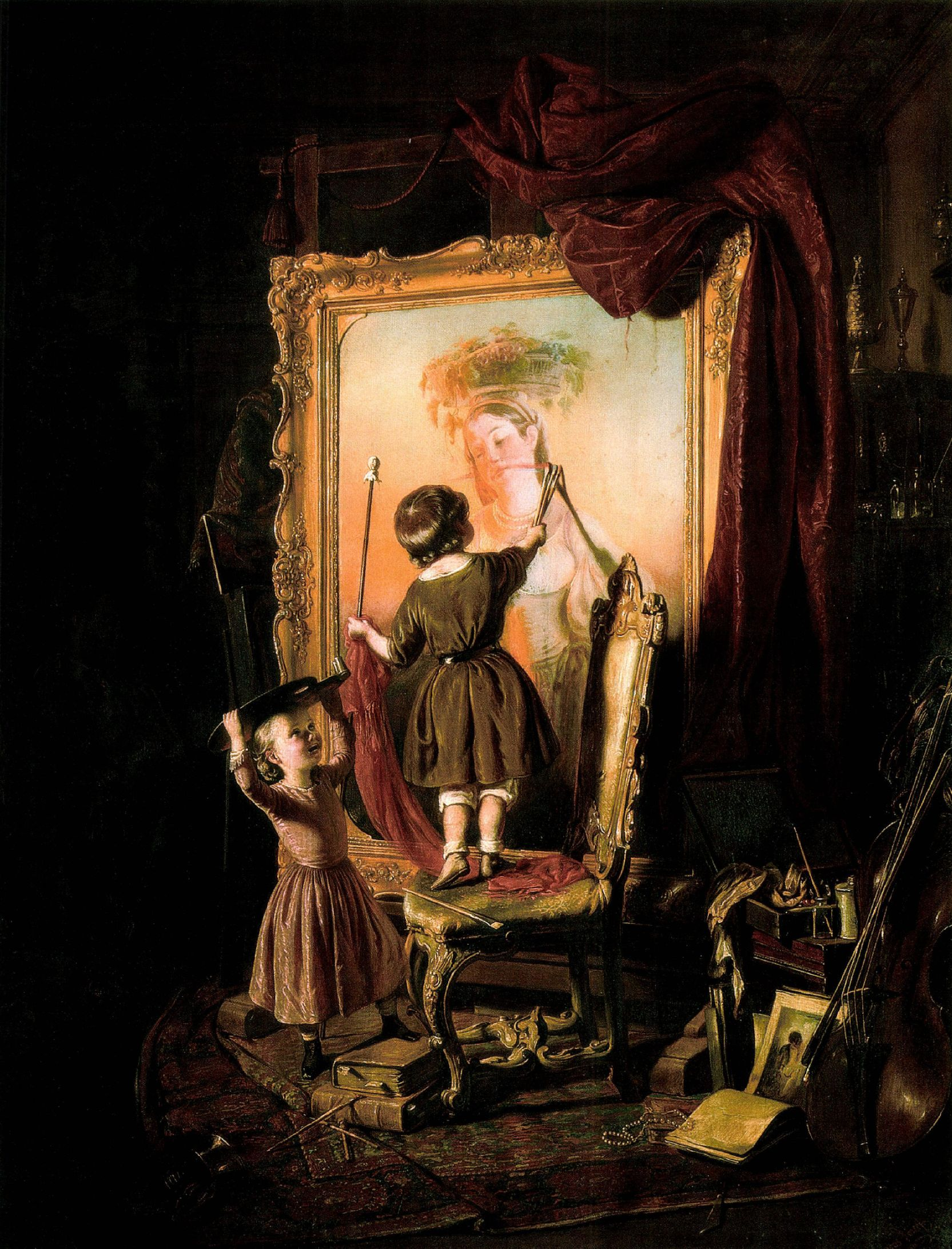
The Artist's Dream (The Little Painter), 1851

== Sources ==
- Biographical notes @ Fine Arts in Hungary
- Szabó Júlia: A XIX.század festészete Magyarországon, Corvina Kiadó, 1985, ISBN 963-13-1908-3
- Seregélyi György: Magyar festők és grafikusok adattára, Szeged, 1988, ISBN 963-500-817-1
- Szvoboda Dománszky Gabriella: A magyar biedermeier (Stílusok-korszakok sorozat), Corvina Kiadó, 2011, ISBN 978-963-13-5990-9
