= Eduard Schön =

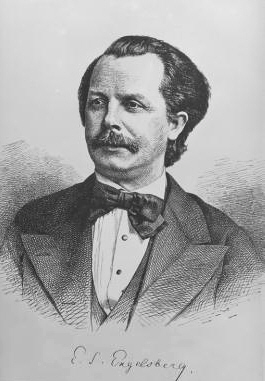
Engelsberg, E. S. Pseudonym für Eduard Schön1

E. S. Engelsberg (23 January 1825 – 27 May 1879) was a Silesian-Austrian composer.

Eduard Schön used the pseudonym Engelsberg or ES Engelsberg after the village he was born – Engelsberg (now Engelsberg in Schlesien, in the Bruntál District), Austrian Silesia. Schön studied at the Faculty of Philosophy of University of Olomouc and then law at the University of Vienna, finishing in 1850. Later, he worked as a section leader at Ministry of Finance and as general secretary of Stock Exchange in Vienna. He died in Deutsch Jaßnik (Jeseník nad Odrou.

== Composer ==
Schön composed his first songs and piano pieces while studying in Olomouc.

During the revolution in 1848 he composed the student song "German Song of Freedom" (Deutsches Freiheitslied).

Later, Engelsberg primarily composed church music together with several instrumental works. He also set several law texts to music.
