= Moritz Jursitzky =

Moritz Jursitzky (27 January 1861 in Andělská Hora – 28 August 1936 in Vienna) was an Austrian-Silesian writer.

== Life ==
Born as a son of a weaver master craftsman, Moritz Jursitzky worked as well as a weaver for a long time. Only late in his life it was possible to earn a living with his writing. Starting with 1909 he was supported by the "German Schiller foundation" (deutsche Schillerstiftung).

== List of publications ==
Novels:

- "Die Förster-Zilli": The forester Zilli - artistnovel from the World War I prewartime
- "Um Recht und Ehre": About right an honour
- "Auf steiler Dornenbahn" : On steep thorn alley
- "Serenissimus als Bürger" : Serenissimus as citizen
- "Das hungernde Wien" : The starving vienna
- "Der Parnass" : The Parnass

Silesian poems:

- "Hoch'naus!": burlesque written in Silesian German dialect
