= Engelberg (Leonberg) =

Coordinates: 48°48′07″N 9°01′31″E

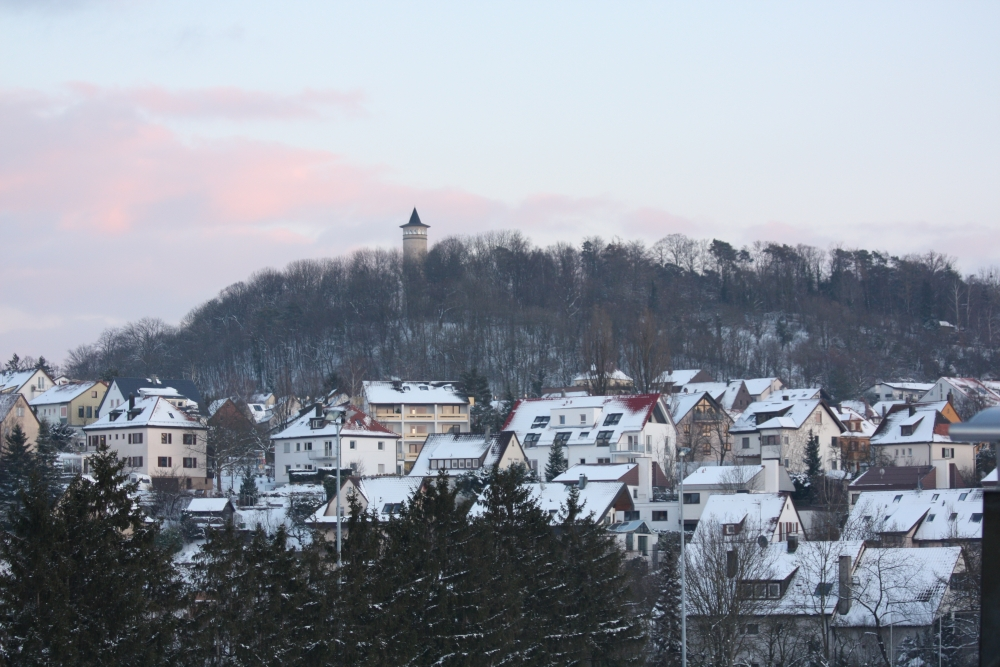
- Engelberg pictured in 2009

Naming
- English translation: Angel-Mountain
- Language of name: German

Geography
- Location: Baden-Württemberg, Germany

Engelberg (Leonberg) is a mountain of Baden-Württemberg, Germany. The mountain rises up over the town of Leonberg, Engelberg at a height of 480.60 metres (1,576.8 ft). Originally known as Endelberg, it has been called by its current name since the 16th century.

The mountain served as a military post with a tall watchtower in the Middle Ages. During the 19th century, parts of Engelberg were allotted to local citizens for gardening, and a forest was planted in 1840. The old watchtower was renovated by the Leonberg municipal council in 1842. The area became a popular destination for walkers.

The current Engelberg tower was opened in 1928, originally as a water tower for a golf course on the nearby heath. Disused as a water tower since 1982, it is now a well known lookout tower for tourists. Visitors climb 123 steps to reach the viewing platform, for a panoramic view of the mountains around Heilbronn; the Black Forest is also visible in the distance when the weather is clear.

There is a concentration camp memorial near the old Engelberg tunnel, which was converted into a production facility where prisoners were forced to work during the Second World War.
