= Andělská Hora (Bruntál District) =

- Town
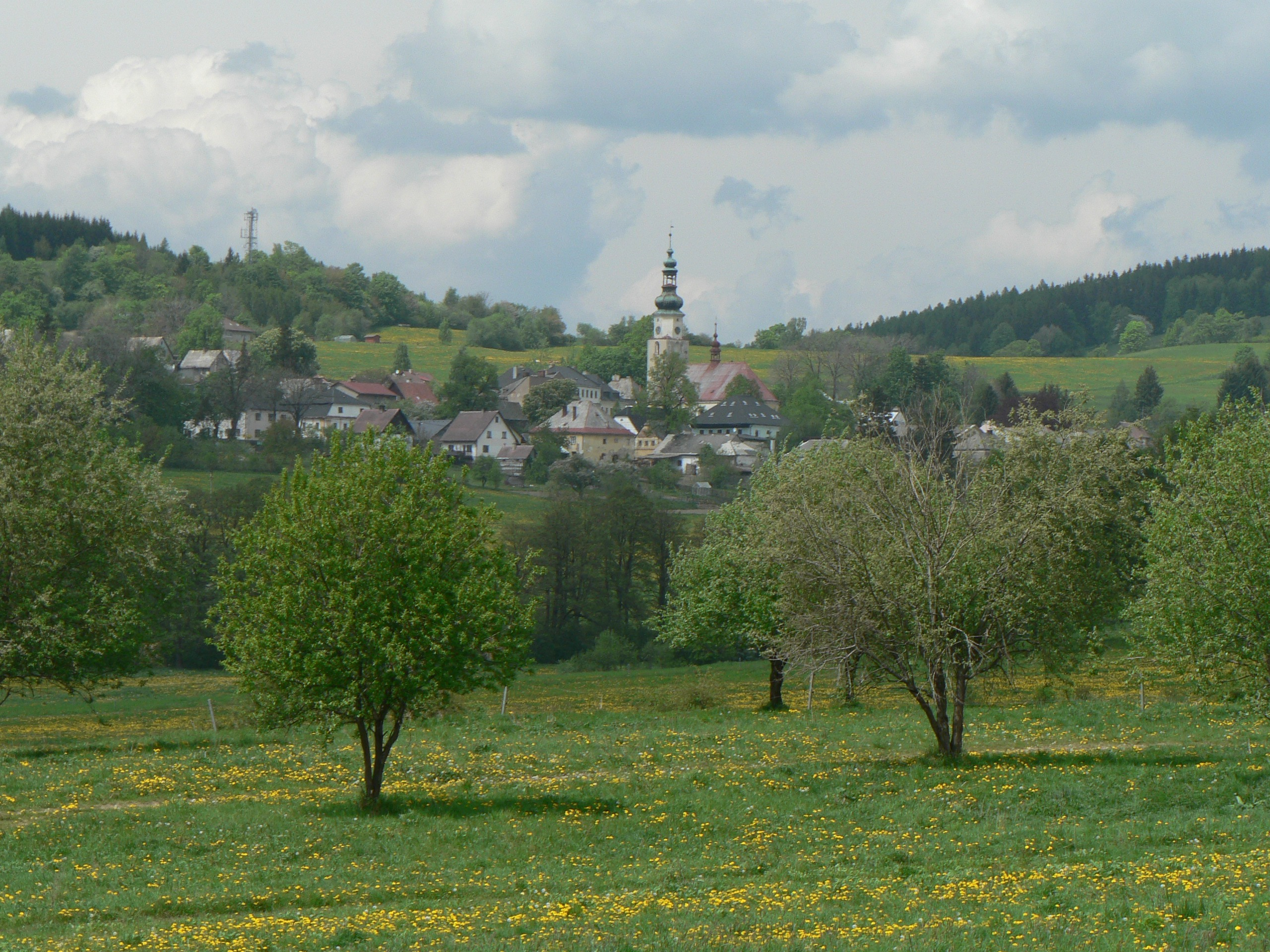
- View from the south

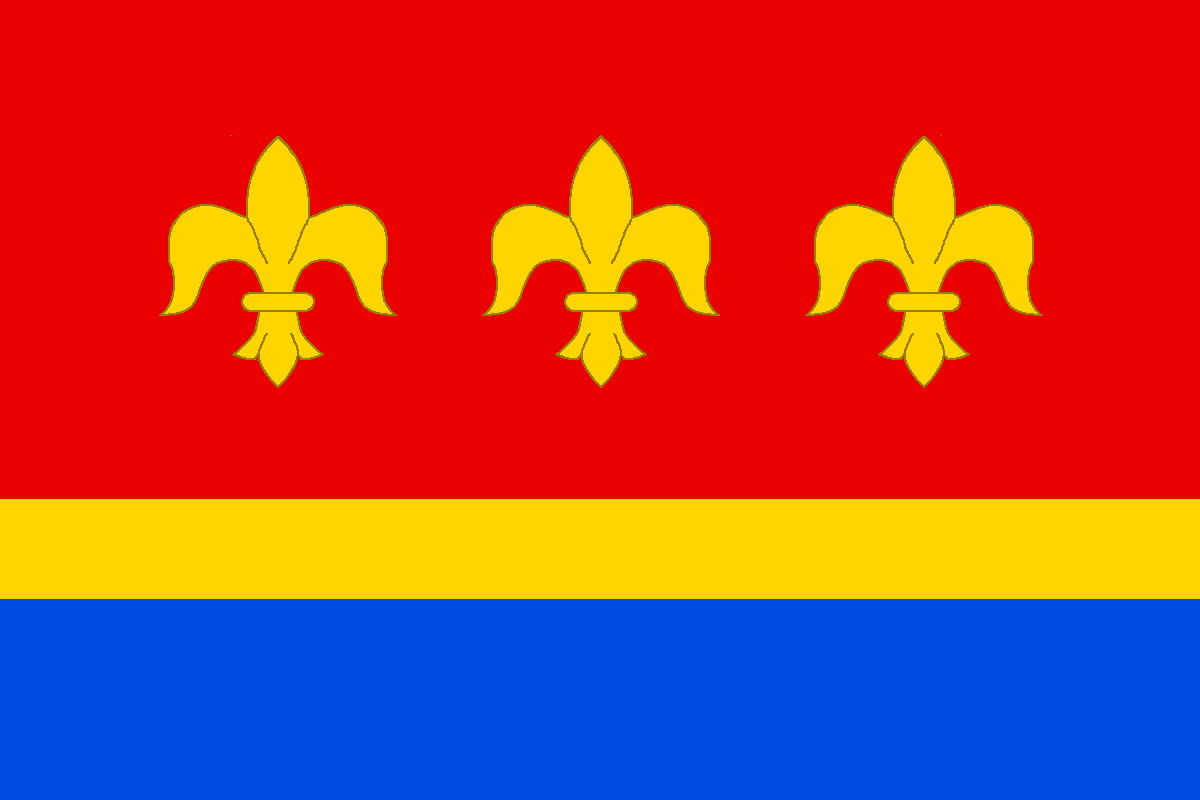
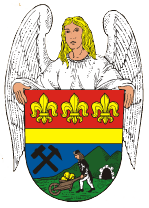
- Flag Coat of arms

- Location in the Czech Republic
- Coordinates: 50°3′39″N 17°23′21″E
- Country: Czech Republic
- District: Moravian-Silesian
- First mentioned: 1540

Government
  - Mayor: Miroslav Novotný

Area
  - Total: 15.90 km^{2} (6.14 sq mi)
- Elevation: 640 m (2,100 ft)

Population (2026-01-01)
  - Total: 355
  - Density: 22.3/km^{2} (57.8/sq mi)
- Time zone: UTC+1 (CET)
  - Summer (DST): UTC+2 (CEST)
- Postal code: 793 32
- Website: www.andelskahora.info

Andělská Hora (Czech pronunciation: [ˈanɟɛlskaː ˈɦora]; German: Engelsberg) is a town in Bruntál District in the Moravian-Silesian Region of the Czech Republic. It has about 400 inhabitants.

== Administrative division ==
Andělská Hora consists of two municipal parts (in brackets population according to the 2021 census):

- Andělská Hora (348)
- Pustá Rudná (13)

== Etymology ==
In Czech, the name Andělská Hora means 'angel mountain'.

== Geography ==
Andělská Hora is located about 9 kilometres (6 mi) northwest of Bruntál and 52 km (32 mi) north of Olomouc. It lies in the Hrubý Jeseník mountain range. The highest point is the mountain Vysoká hora at 1,031 m (3,383 ft) above sea level.

== History ==
Andělská Hora was founded in 1540 as a mining town. In 1553 it received a mining register and in 1556 it was furnished with all necessary permissions for mining by Jan the Elder of Vrbno and Bruntál. After the Thirty Years' War, the town was given to the Teutonic Order, which owned it until 1639.

According to the Austro-Hungarian census of 1910, the village had 1,789 inhabitants, 1,767 (99.7%) were German-speaking. Most populous religious group were Roman Catholics with 1,761 (98.4%).

== Demographics ==
Historical population

Year	Pop.	±%
1869	2,270	—
1880	2,353	+3.7%
1890	2,270	−3.5%
1900	2,043	−10.0%
1910	1,789	−12.4%

Year	Pop.	±%
1921	1,435	−19.8%
1930	1,417	−1.3%
1950	514	−63.7%
1961	579	+12.6%
1970	501	−13.5%

Year	Pop.	±%
1980	419	−16.4%
1991	384	−8.4%
2001	383	−0.3%
2011	362	−5.5%
2021	361	−0.3%

Source: Censuses

== Transport ==
There are no railways or major roads passing through the municipality.

== Sights ==
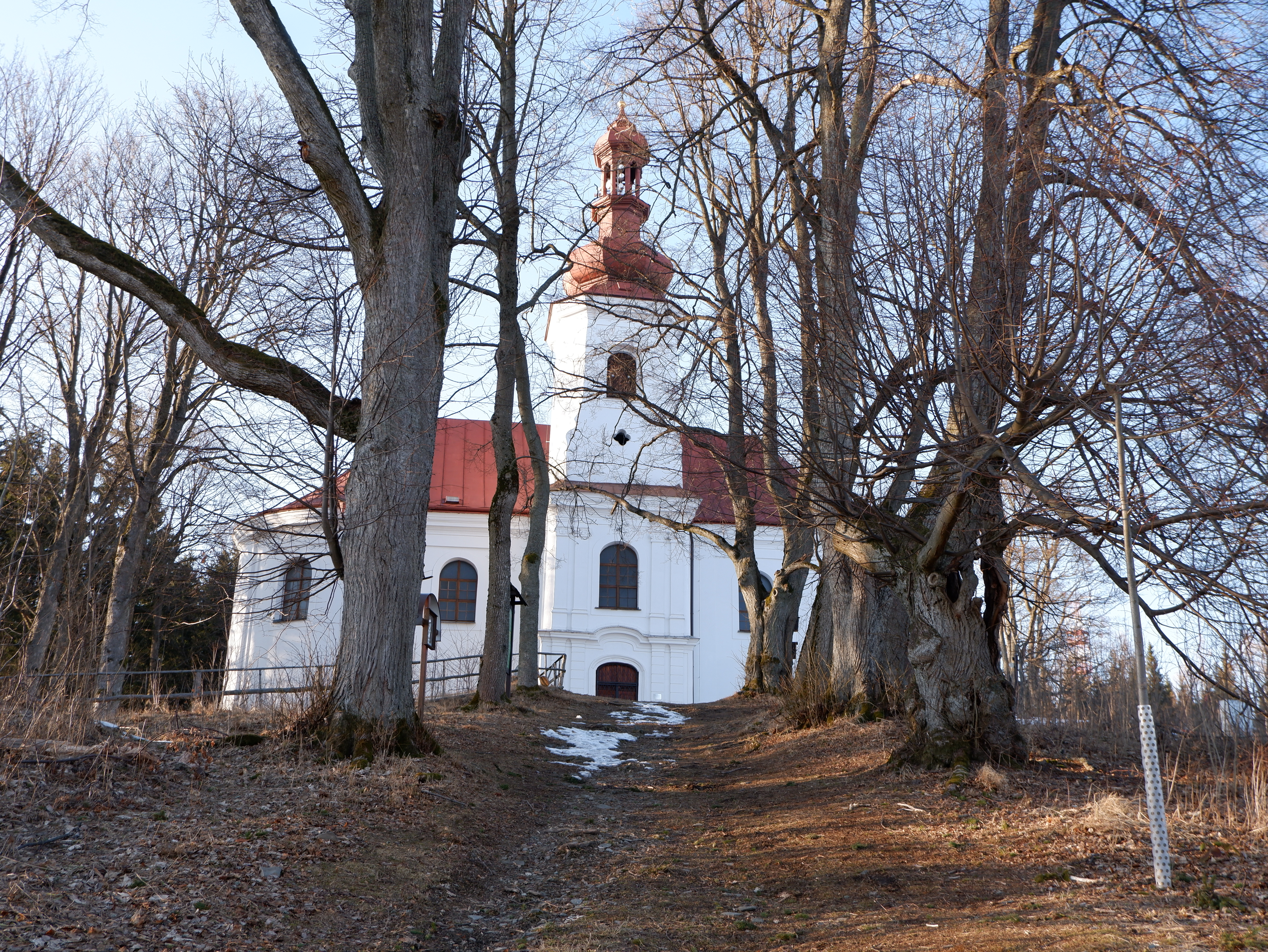
Church of Saint Anne

A wooden church existed here already in 1500, but was burned down during the Thirty Years' War. The Church of the Nativity of the Virgin Mary was built in the early Baroque style in 1672 and was reconstructed in 1734, after it was damaged by the fire in 1732. It is the landmark of the village. In front of the church stands a Baroque statue of Saint John of Nepomuk from 1724.

On the town square are an Empire sandstone cross from 1815 and several late Baroque houses from the second half of the 18th century.

On the hill called Anenský vrch is the Church of Saint Anne. This pilgrimage church was originally a wooden chapel, built in 1694–1696. The current church was built in 1766–1772. A linden alley with the Stations of the Cross leads to the church.

== Notable people ==
- Albert Schindler (1805–1861), Austrian Biedermeier painter and engraver
- Eduard Schön (1825–1879), Silesian-Austrian composer
- Moritz Jursitzky (1861–1936), Silesian-Austrian writer

== Twin towns – sister cities ==
Andělská Hora is twinned with:

- Reńska Wieś, Poland
