= Peter Fendi =

Austrian artist (1796–1842)

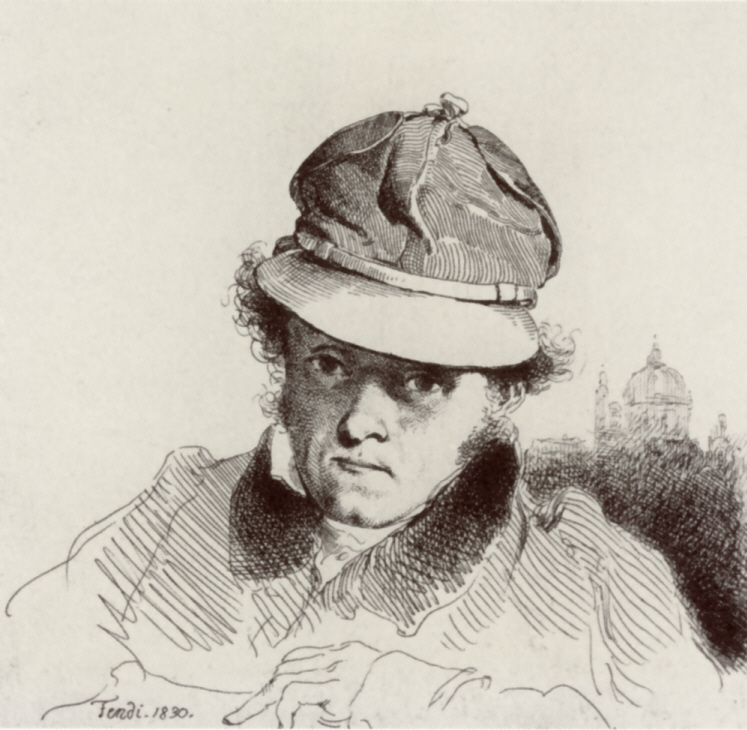
- Self-portrait (1830)
- Born: 4 September 1796; Vienna, Archduchy of Austria
- Died: 28 August 1842 (aged 45); Vienna, Austrian Empire
- Known for: Painter, Lithographer

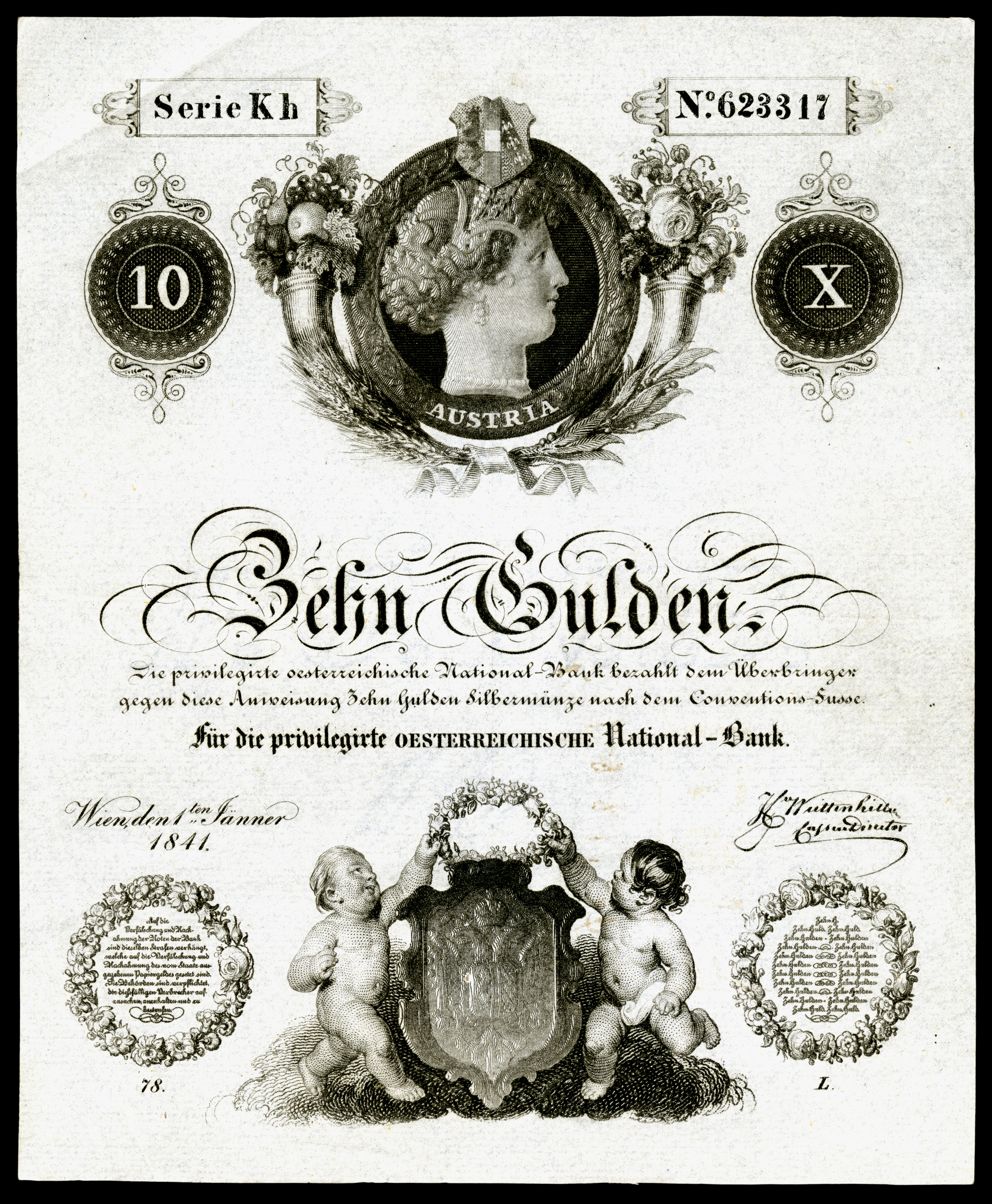
Austrian 10 Gulden (1841) engraved by Fendi

Peter Fendi (4 September 1796 – 28 August 1842) was an Austrian court painter, portrait and genre painter, engraver, and lithographer. He was one of the leading artists of the Biedermeier period.

== About ==
Peter Fendi was born in Vienna on 4 September 1796, to Joseph and Elizabeth Fendi. His father was a schoolmaster. He fell from a changing table as an infant, an accident which caused irreparable damage to his spine. Fendi demonstrated a talent for drawing from childhood. He was admitted to the St. Anna's Academy of Fine Art in 1810 at the age of thirteen, where he studied for three years under Johann Martin Fischer, Hubert Maurer and Johann Baptist von Lampi the Elder.

Fendi met Joseph Barth, an art collector and the personal ophthalmologist of Joseph II, and through Barth's connections to other influential artists, in 1818 Fendi found a job at the Imperial Gallery of Coins and Antiquities, where he worked as a draughtsman and engraver. Fendi received a gold medal in 1821 for his oil painting Vilenica, and was elected a member of the Academy of Fine Arts Vienna in 1836.

Both nobles and commoners occasionally employed Fendi to give instruction in drawing and painting, and later in life teaching took up more of his time; his pupils included Carl Schindler and Friedrich Treml. He died on 28 August 1842.

== Works ==
Fendi painted in oil and watercolours, as well as working with printing, etching, lithography and wood carving. Multicolored prints by Fendi are considered pioneering achievements in the field of lithography. Fendi is remembered for his genre scenes, influenced by Dutch painters such as Adriaen Brouwer, Adriaen van Ostade and Rembrandt. Other influences on Fendi's artistic development included the works of Italians such as Giovanni Bellini, Tintoretto, Titian, and Paolo Veronese, which he saw on a trip to Venice in 1821. He is also well known for his portraits of the aristocracy.

Fendi engraved a series five of Austrian banknotes that were issued in 1841.

His works are preserved in the Albertina Museum, the Austrian Gallery in the Belvedere, Kunsthistorisches Museum, and in the collections of the Prince of Liechtenstein in Vaduz.

== Gallery ==
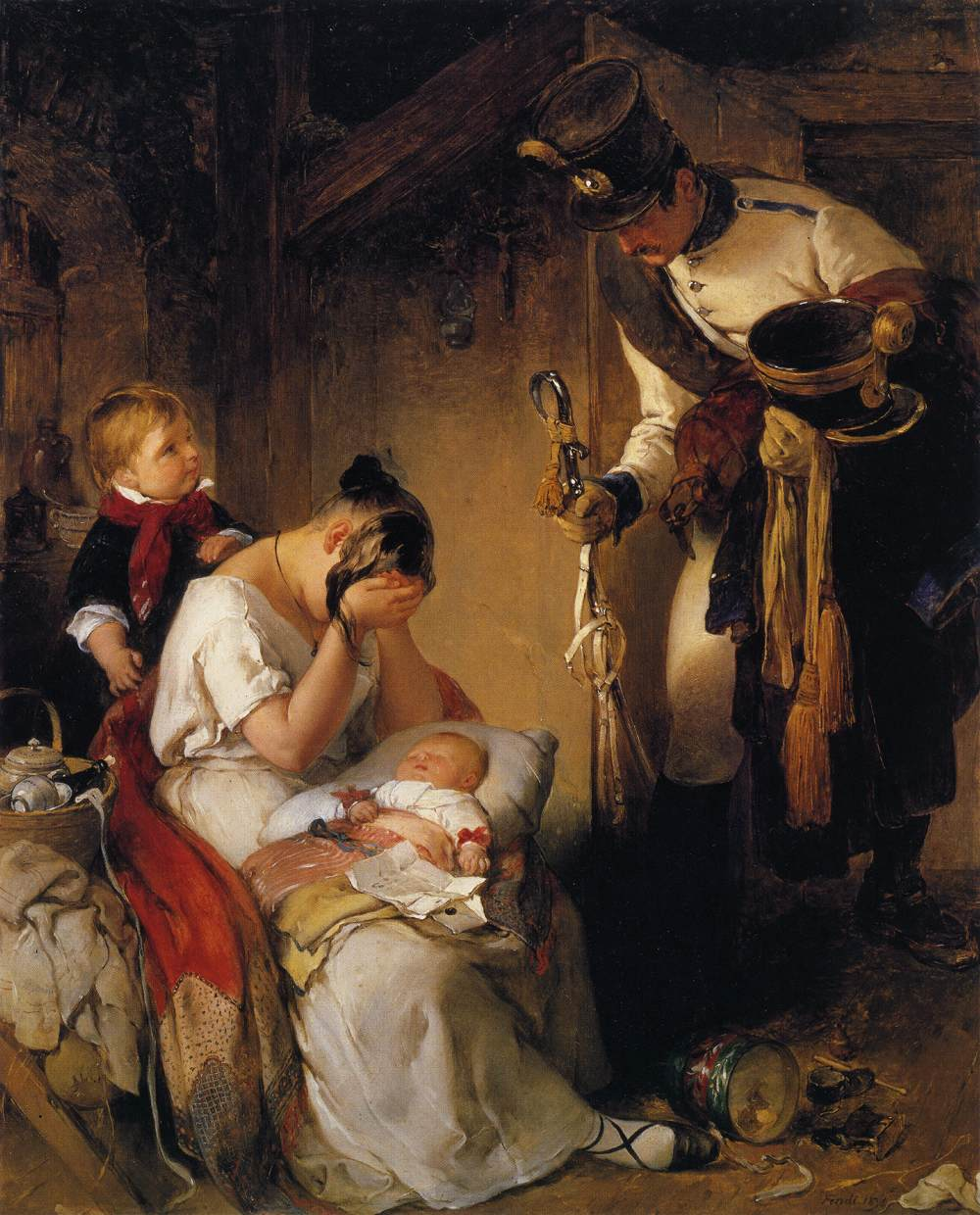
The Sad Message

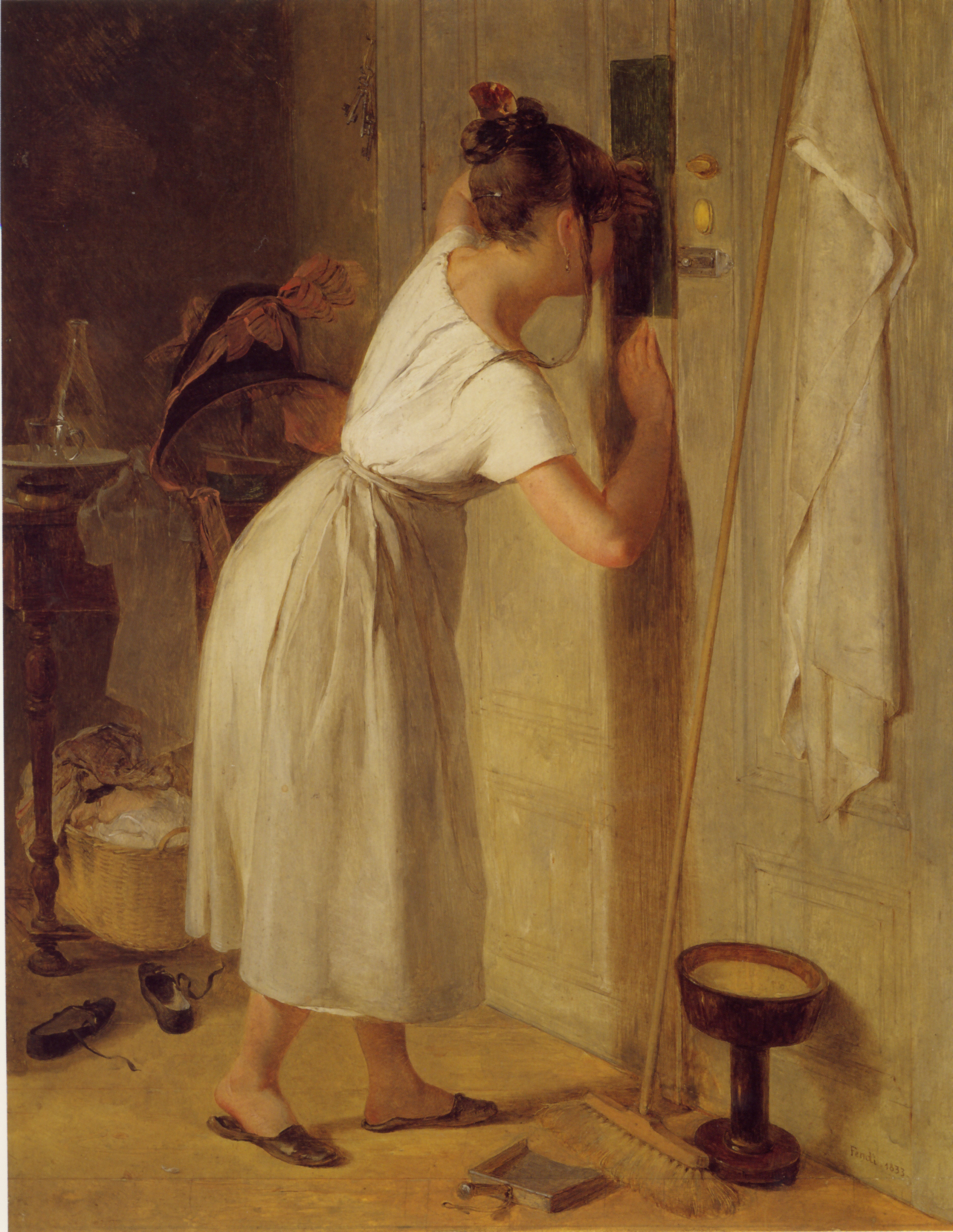
The Eavesdropper

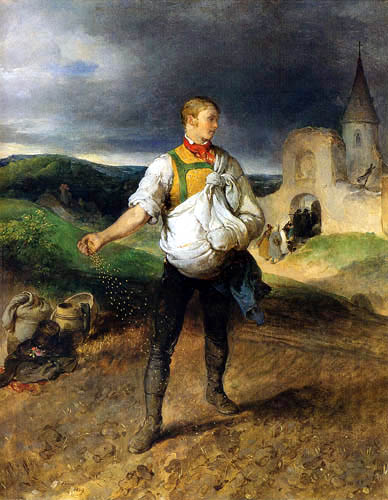
The Sower

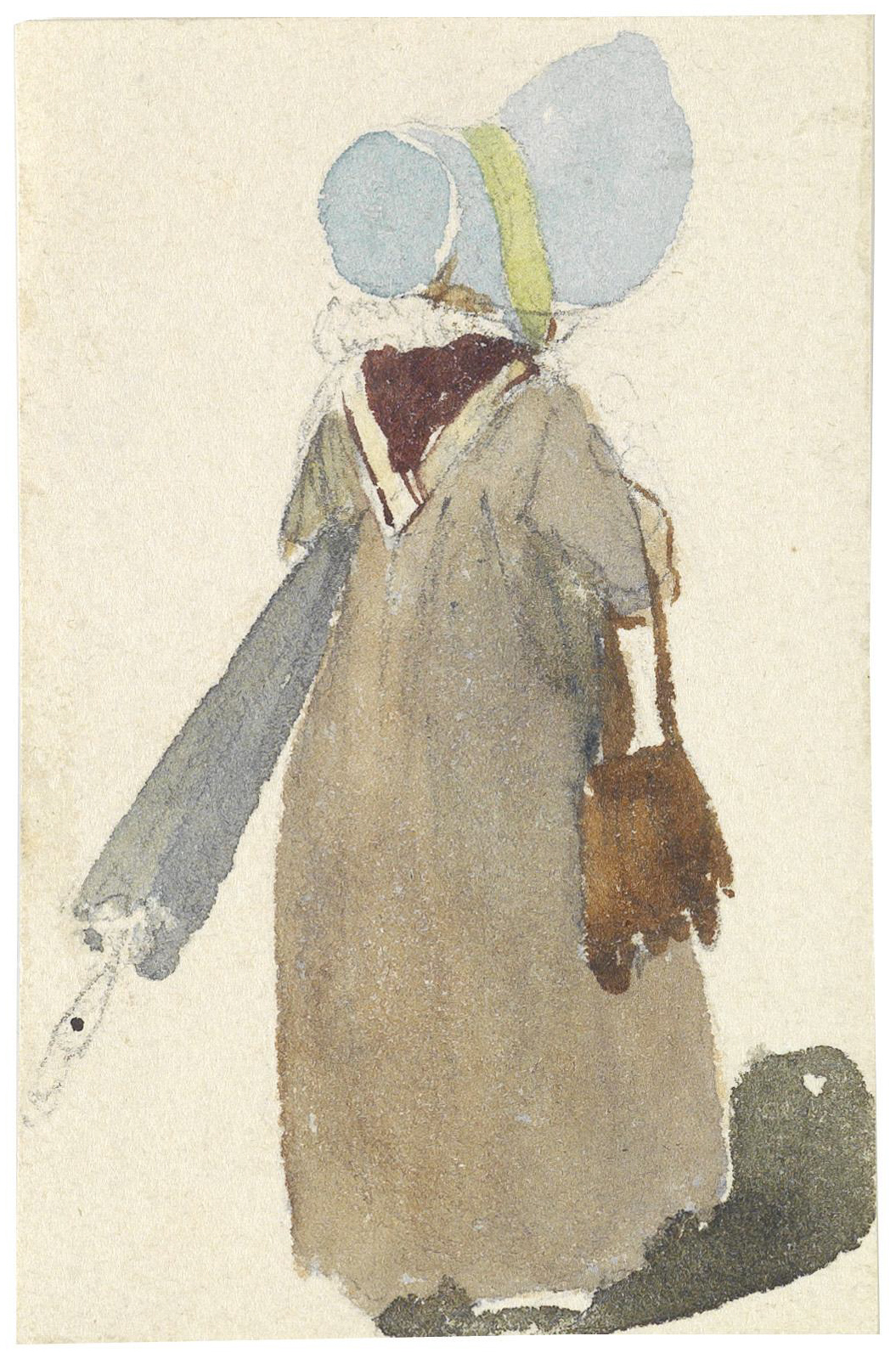
Woman with Turquoise Hat and Umbrella

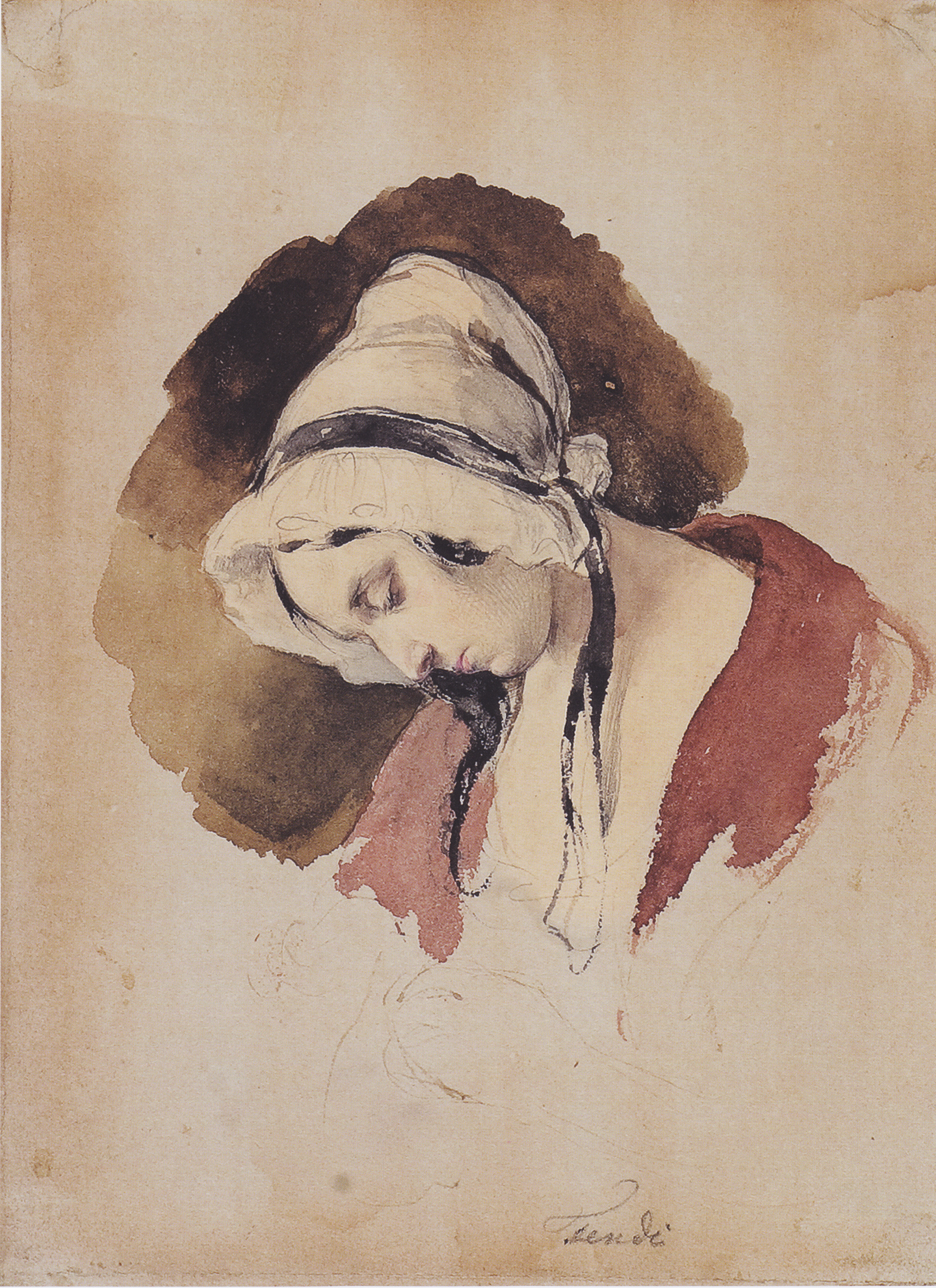
The Poor Officer's Widow

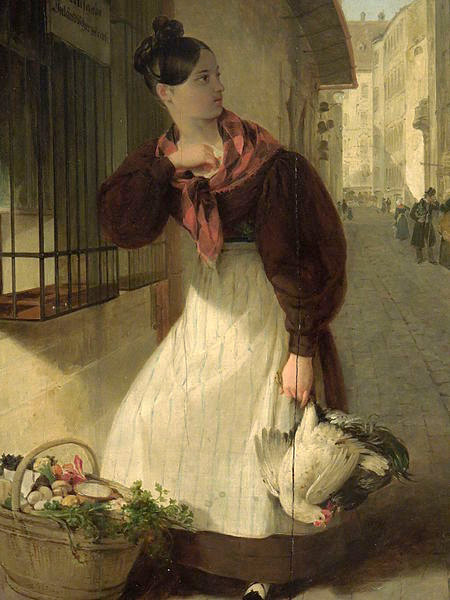
Maid with a Letter

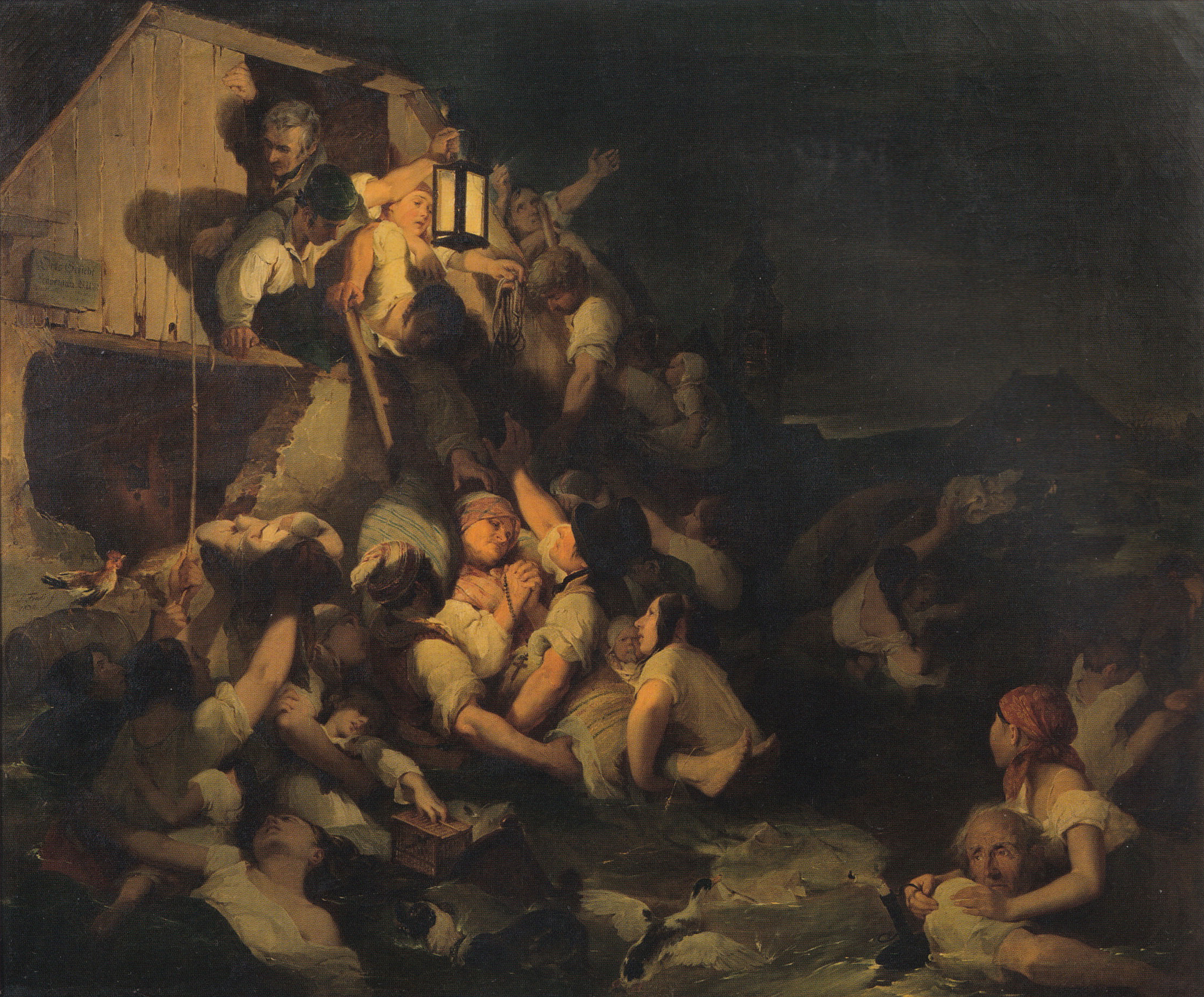
Scene of the Flooding
