= Carl Schindler =

Austrian painter

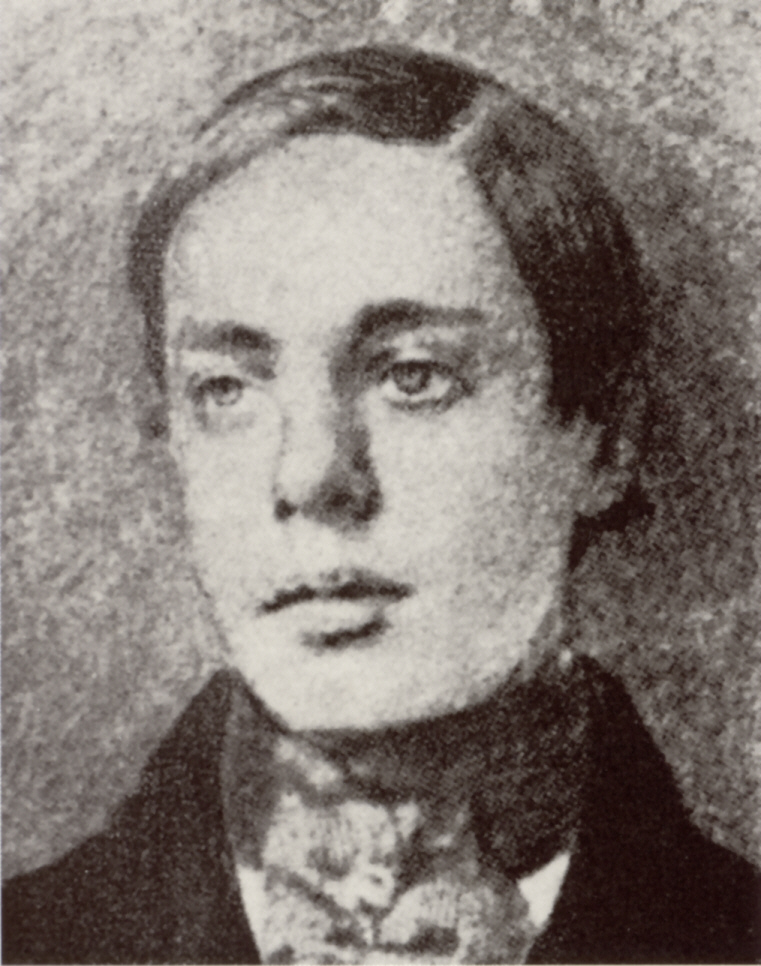
Carl Schindler (self-portrait?)

Carl Vincenz Schindler (23 October 1821 in Vienna – 22 August 1842 in Laab im Walde) was an Austrian military painter in the Biedermeier style. He was sometimes referred to as "Soldaten-Schindler" (Soldier Schindler).

== Life ==
He received his first lessons from his father, the painter and engraver Johann Josef Schindler, who also encouraged his interest in military subjects.

In 1836, he enrolled at the Academy of Fine Arts, where he studied with Carl Gsellhofer and Leopold Kupelwieser. Later, he took private lessons from his father's friend, Peter Fendi. It was Fendi who introduced him to the works of the French military painters, Hippolyte Bellangé, Nicolas Toussaint Charlet, Eugène Lami and Auguste Raffet. In 1839, he had his first exhibition at the academy.

He was suffering from tuberculosis and his health was fragile, so he had to interrupt his studies several times. He visited Laab im Walde, to try the "water cure", but it was to no avail and he died there at the age of twenty-one.

Rather than portray battle scenes or heroic acts, he preferred to focus on the soldiers' daily lives, creating a link between military art and genre painting. His works influenced Friedrich Treml and August von Pettenkofen.

== Selected paintings ==
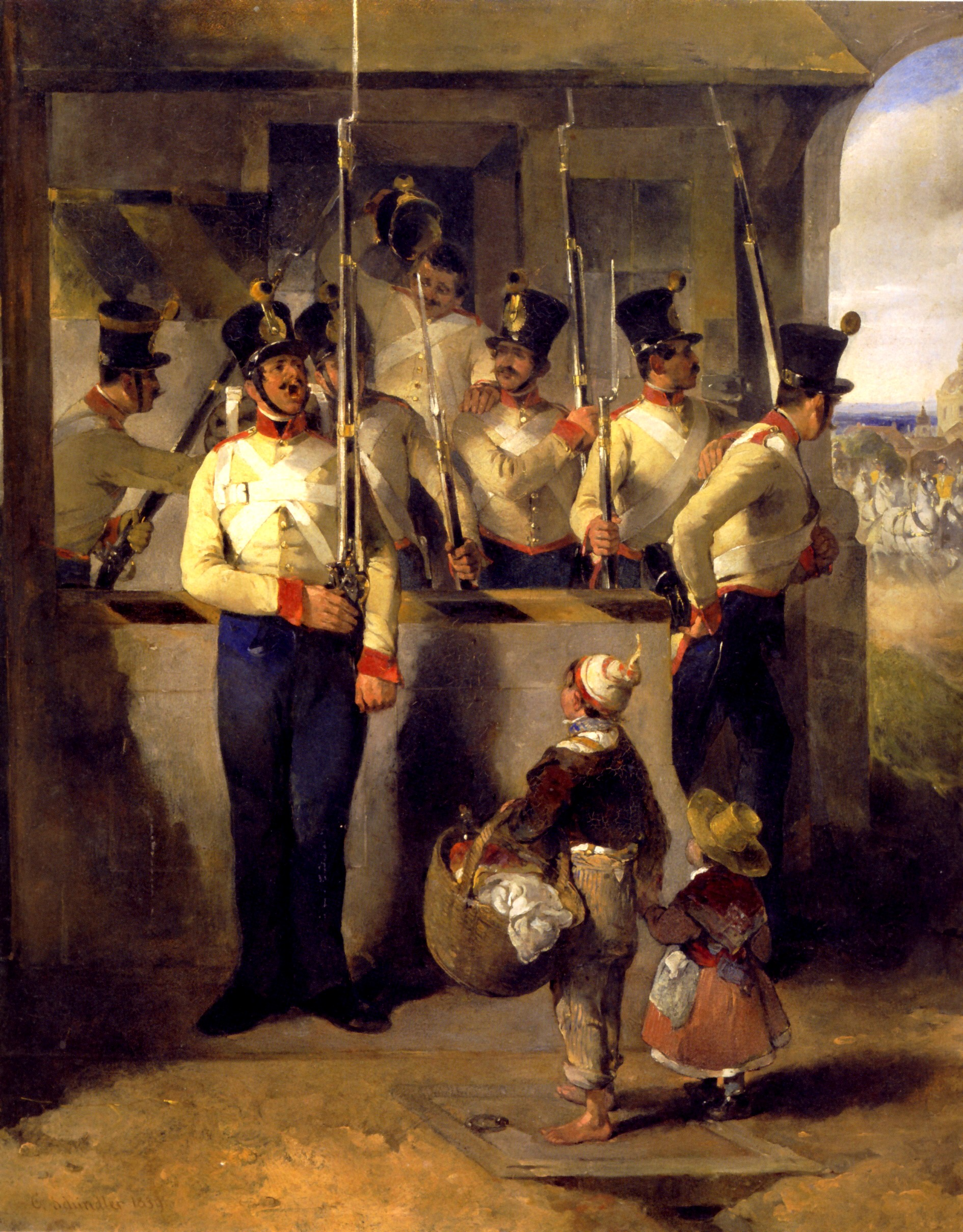
The Sentinel

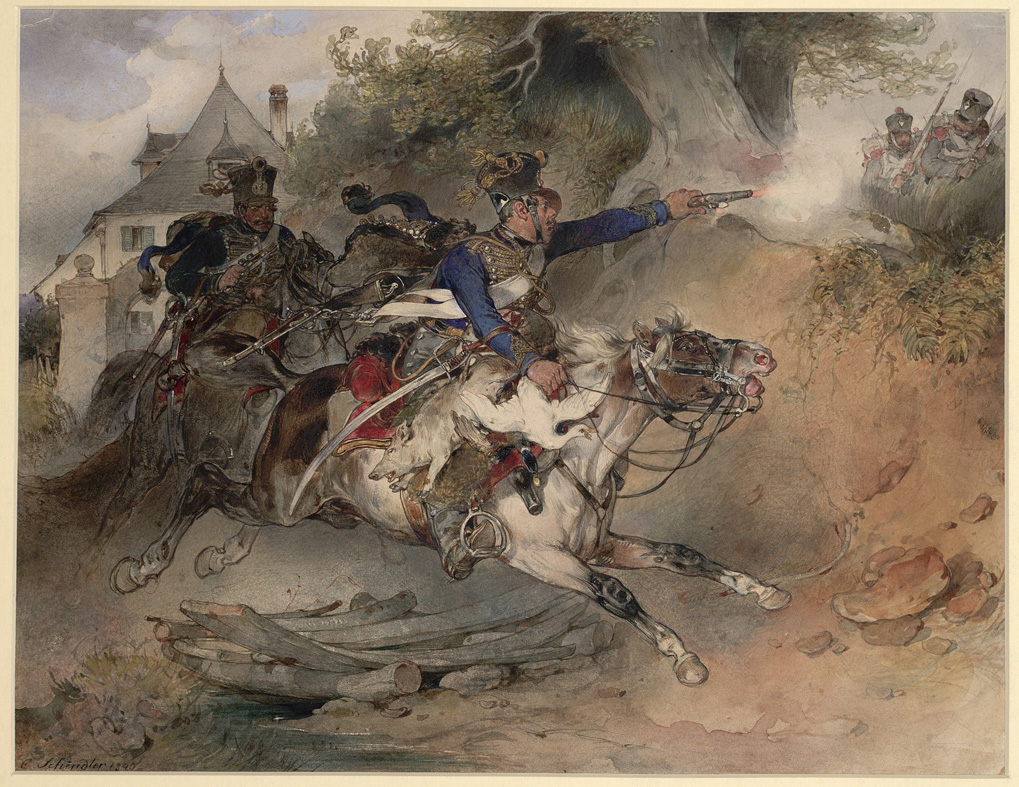
Foraging Hussars

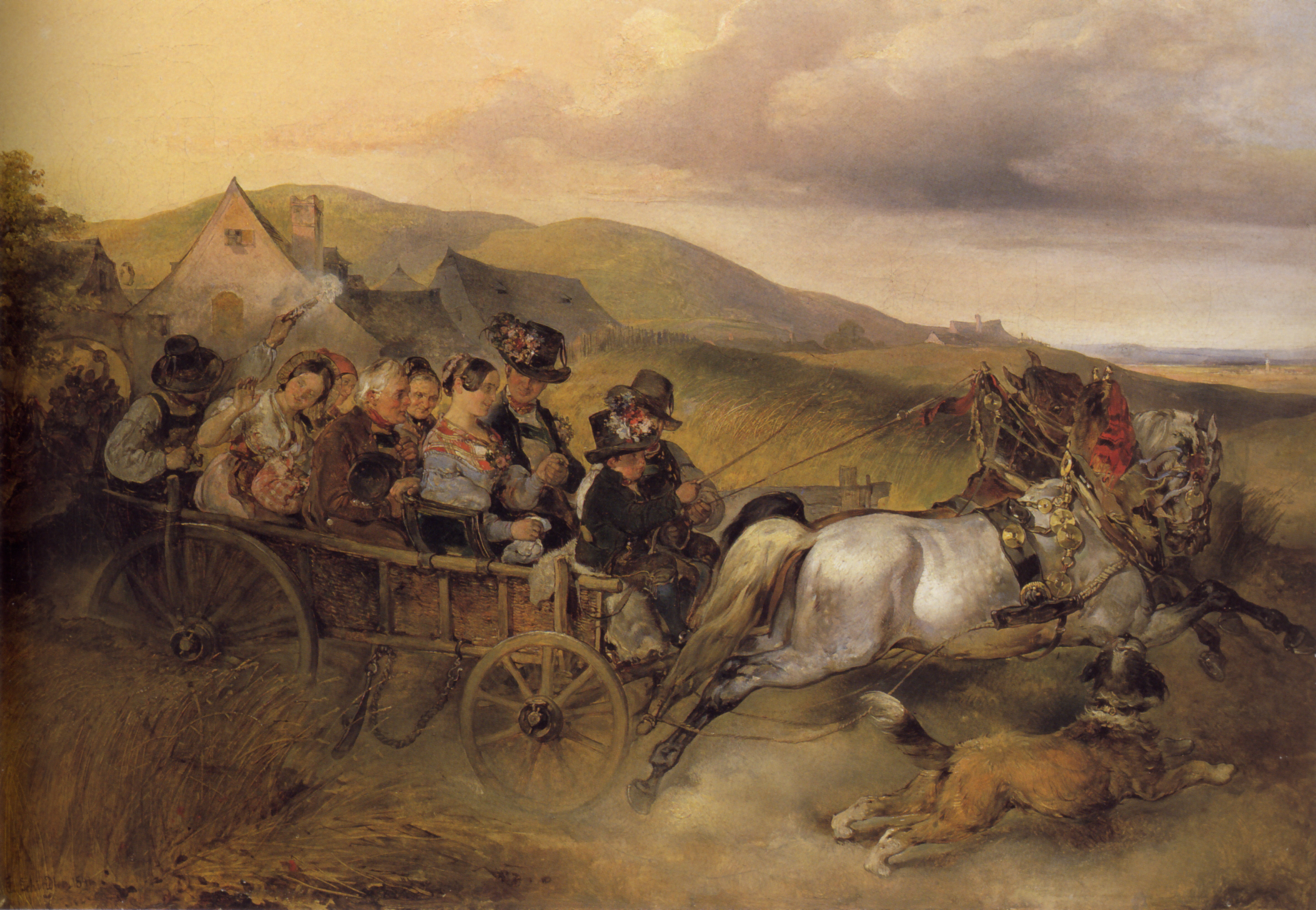
The Wedding Journey

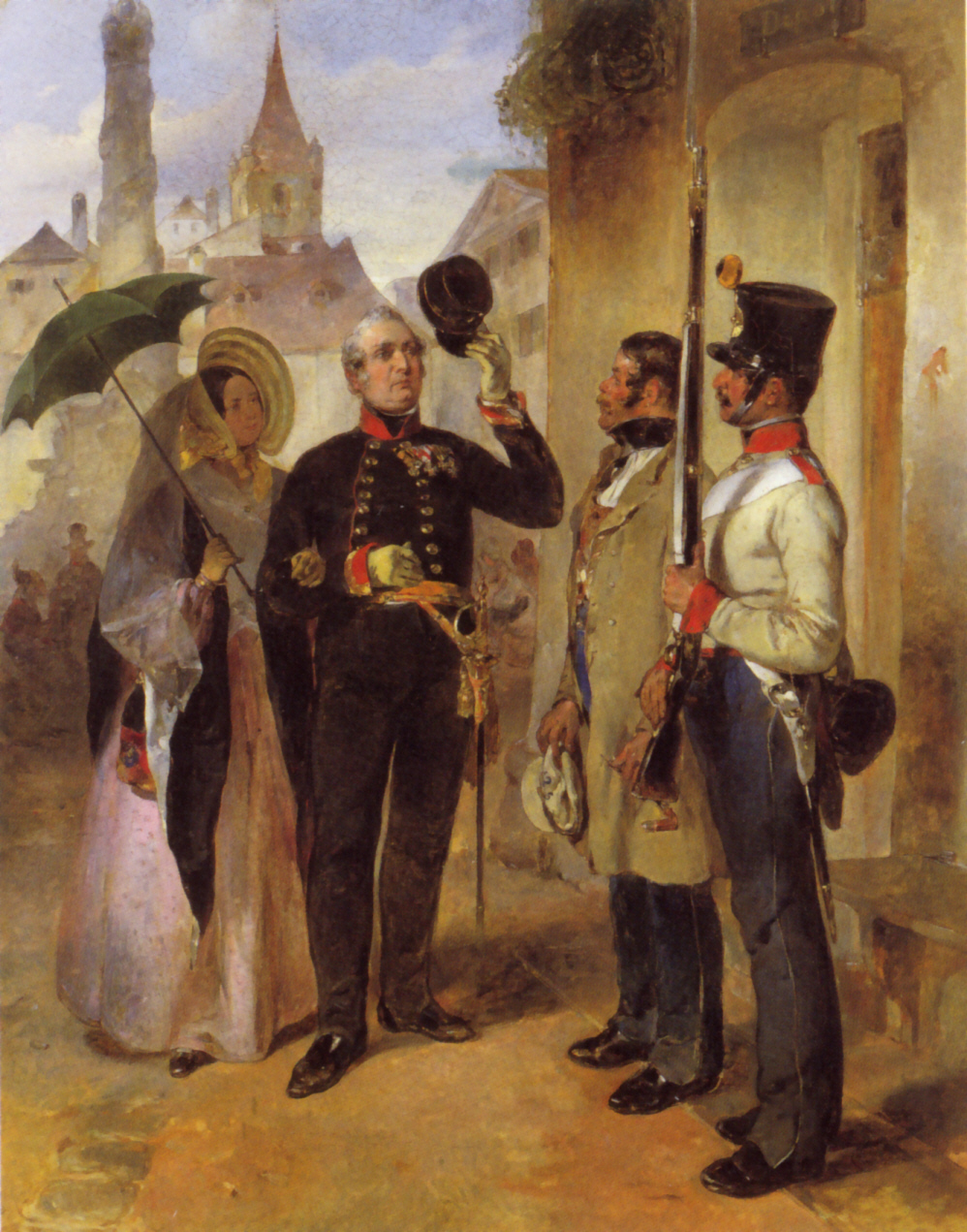
The Sentry
