= Orlík (mountain) =

1,204 metre mountain in the Hrubý Jeseník range, Czech Republic

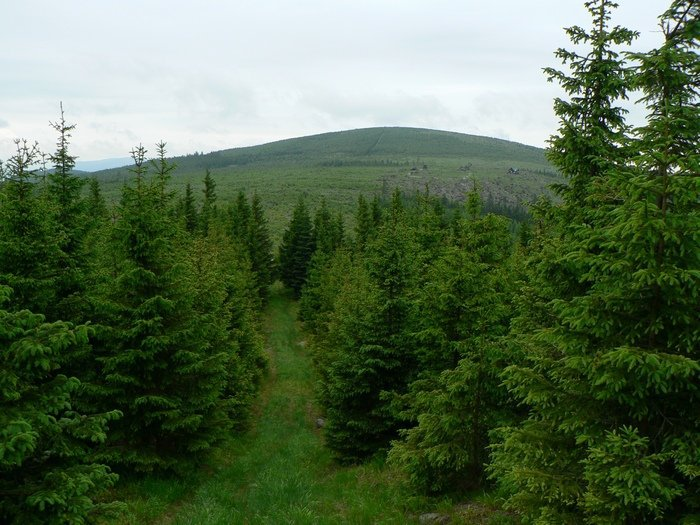
- View from the slope of Medvědí vrch to the top of Orlík

Highest point
- Elevation: 1,204 m (3,950 ft)
- Prominence: 91 m (299 ft)
- Coordinates: 50°10′36″N 17°17′56″E

Geography
- Location within Czech Republic
- Location: Zlaté Hory
- Parent range: Hrubý Jeseník

Orlík (German: Urlichkuppe) is a mountain in the Hrubý Jeseník mountain range in the Czech Republic. It has an elevation of 1,204 m (3,950 ft) above sea level. It is located in the municipality of Zlaté Hory.

== Characteristics ==
=== Location ===
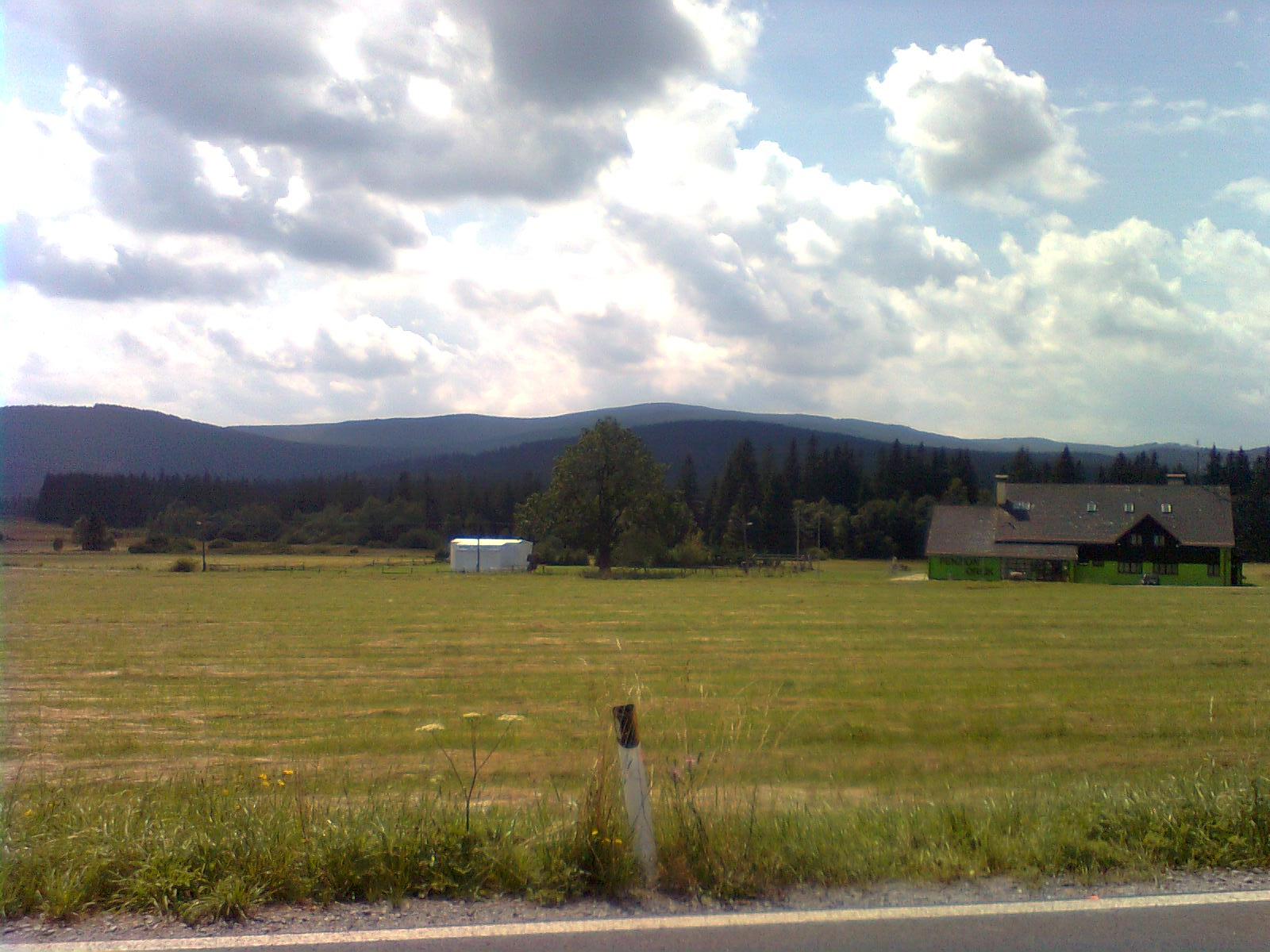
View from the village of Rejvíz of the peaks Zámecký vrch (1), Medvědí vrch and Orlík. Below Přední Jestřábí, Orlík–Z and Orlík–SZ (above the Orlík guesthouse)

Orlík is located in the northeastern part of the Hrubý Jeseník range, specifically in the microregion known as the Medvědí Mountains. It is the third highest peak of the Medvědí Mountains, after Medvědí vrch and Jelení loučky. Orlík is a very expansive mountain, situated on two arms (ridges) of this massif: the main, arched ridge stretching from Zámecký vrch (1) (Note: The indexed designation distinguishes it from another peak in the same range with the same name, Zámecký vrch (2), which is located 3 km southeast of the town of Vrbno pod Pradědem.) to Na vyhlídce (1) (Note: The indexed designation distinguishes it from another peak in the same range with the same name, Na Vyhlídce (2), which is located near the town of Ludvíkov.) with the main summit, and the side, arched ridge stretching from Kristovo loučení pass to Rejvíz pass with two secondary summits. Orlík is a well-recognizable mountain, as it is located in the central pair of peaks Orlík and Medvědí vrch in this part of the Hrubý Jeseník range, having similar heights and being visible from the observation towers of both Praděd and Biskupia Kopa. However, from another characteristic viewpoint – the road surrounding the summit of Dlouhé stráně – it is not visible as it is obscured by Velký Jezerník mountain. Orlík is well visible, among others, from the summit of Medvědí louka and from the slopes of mountains such as Medvědí vrch and Jelení loučky. Additionally, it is visible and recognizable from the nearby road no. 445 from Rýmařov to Zlaté Hory, as well as from road no. 453 from Jeseník to Město Albrechtice passing through the village of Rejvíz.

The mountain is bounded:

- to the north by the valley of the Opava river;
- to the northeast by a pass at an elevation of 853 meters above sea level towards Zámecký vrch (1), the valley of the Podzámecký stream, and a pass at an elevation of 1,037 meters above sea level towards Stará hora;
- to the east by the valley of the Slučí stream, a pass at an elevation of 731 meters above sea level towards Velká seč, and the valley of the Sokolí stream flowing in the Jezevčí kotlina basin;
- to the south by a pass at an elevation of 1,113 meters above sea level towards Medvědí vrch and a pass at an elevation of 1,097 meters above sea level towards Medvědí louka;
- to the southwest by the valley of the Šumný stream'
- to the west by a pass at an elevation of 1,027 meters above sea level towards Velké Bradlo;
- to the northwest by a pass at an elevation of 1,009 meters above sea level towards Srnčí vrch.

Surrounding the mountain are the following peaks:

- to the northwest, Srnčí vrch, Kazatelny, and Kazatelny–SV;
- to the north, Přední Jestřábí–JZ and Přední Jestřábí;
- to the northeast, Zámecký vrch (1), Stará hora, Rovný vrch, and Rovný vrch–JV;
- to the east, Velká seč;
- to the southeast, Medvědí skály and Medvědí vrch;
- to the southwest, Medvědí louka and Velké Bradlo.

On some maps, additional northern peaks are listed under the names Žárný vrch (1,086 meters above sea level), Žár (1,151 meters above sea level), and Slídový vrch (1,058 meters above sea level). However, due to the weak differentiation and exposure of these peaks relative to the entire Orlík Massif, newer studies and measurements suggest that these names should rather be assigned to their corresponding slopes.

=== Slopes ===
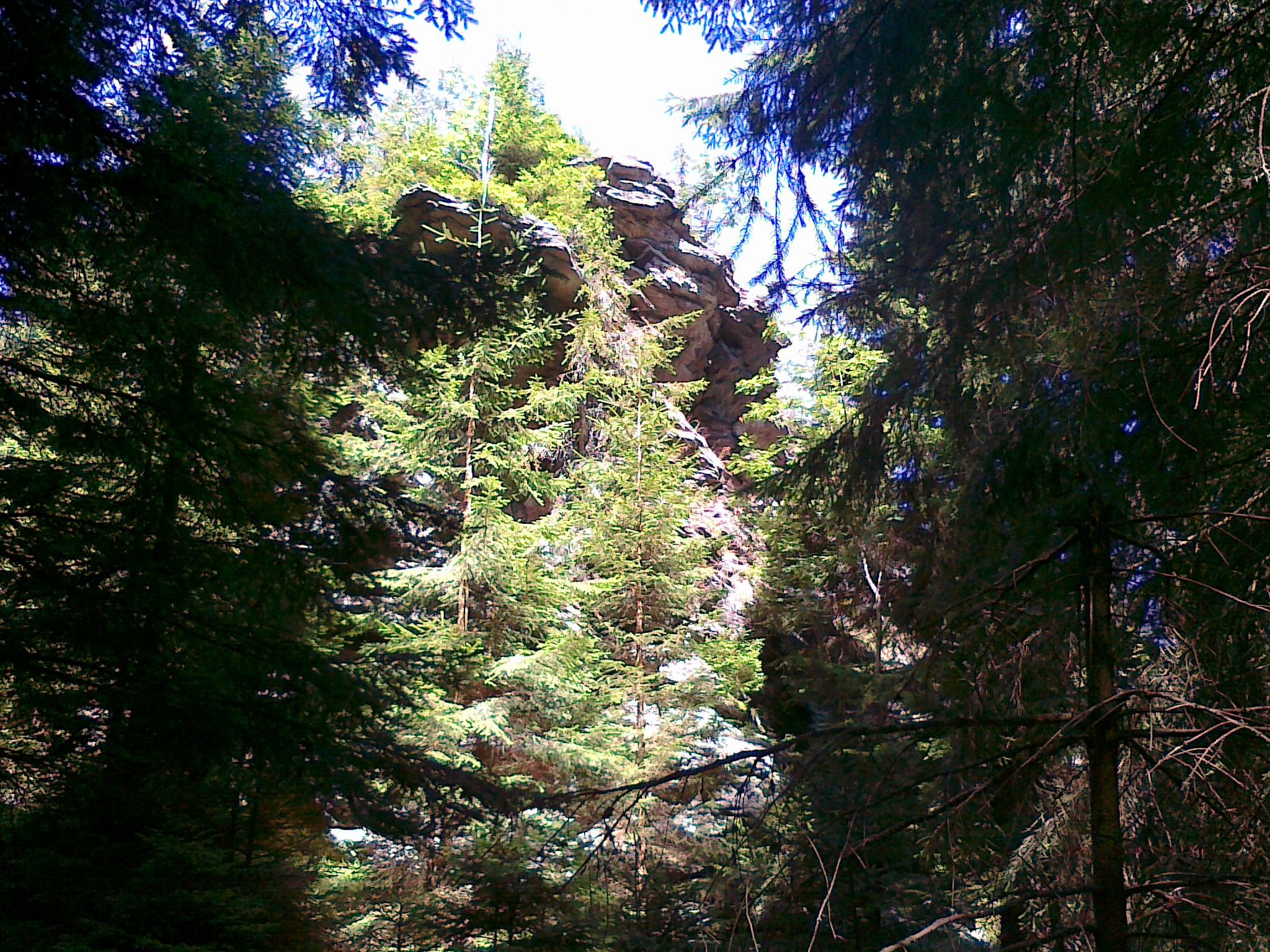
Dlouhá rock group

Within the mountain, the following seven main slopes can be distinguished:

- southern
- southwestern
- western, named Loučení Kristovo
- northwestern, named Žárný vrch
- northern, named Žár, Stráně, Nad Opavou
- northeastern, named Slídový vrch
- eastern, named Dlouhá, Velká seč, Macocha

All types of forestation can be found here: spruce forest, mixed forest, (Note: The forest stand of the entire Jeseníky Protected Landscape Area includes: European spruce 84%, European beech 10%, European larch 1.5%, sycamore maple 1.1%, birch 1%, common alder 0.8%, dwarf mountain pine 0.4%, grey alder 0.3%, (European silver fir, European ash, and linden) 0.2%, Scotch pine 0.1%, and others (Pinus mugo, oak, hornbeam, Norway maple, elm, rowan, green alder, aspen, poplar, and goat willow) 0.2%.) and deciduous forest, with spruce forest predominating. On the western, northeastern, and eastern slopes, mixed forest areas appear as the altitude decreases, and on the western and eastern slopes, even small areas of deciduous forest can be found. Due to the large area of the mountain, almost all slopes feature thinnings, clearings, glades, and meadows. Larger rock formations are found on the northern Stráně slope, the southern slope near the secondary summit Orlík–JV, and the eastern Dlouhá slope, which also features numerous rock groups. On the eastern Dlouhá slope, about 1,170 meters east of the peak, at an elevation of 1,025 meters above sea level, lies a rock group named Dlouhá.

The slopes have uneven, generally gentle, and little-varied inclines. The average slope gradient ranges from 6° (southern and northeastern slopes) to 10° (southwestern and western slopes). The average gradient of all the slopes of the mountain (weighted arithmetic mean of the slopes) is around 8°. The maximum average gradient of the western slope at the base of the secondary peak Orlík–SZ, near the Cesta svobody road, does not exceed 35° over a 50-meter section. Besides a few marked tourist trails, the slopes are covered with a network of intersecting roads (including Opavská cesta, Jelení cesta, Cesta svobody, Medvědí cesta, Osmičková cesta, Ruská cesta, K Jelení chatě, Devítková cesta) and generally unmarked paths and tracks.

==== Forest cemetery of Russian prisoners ====
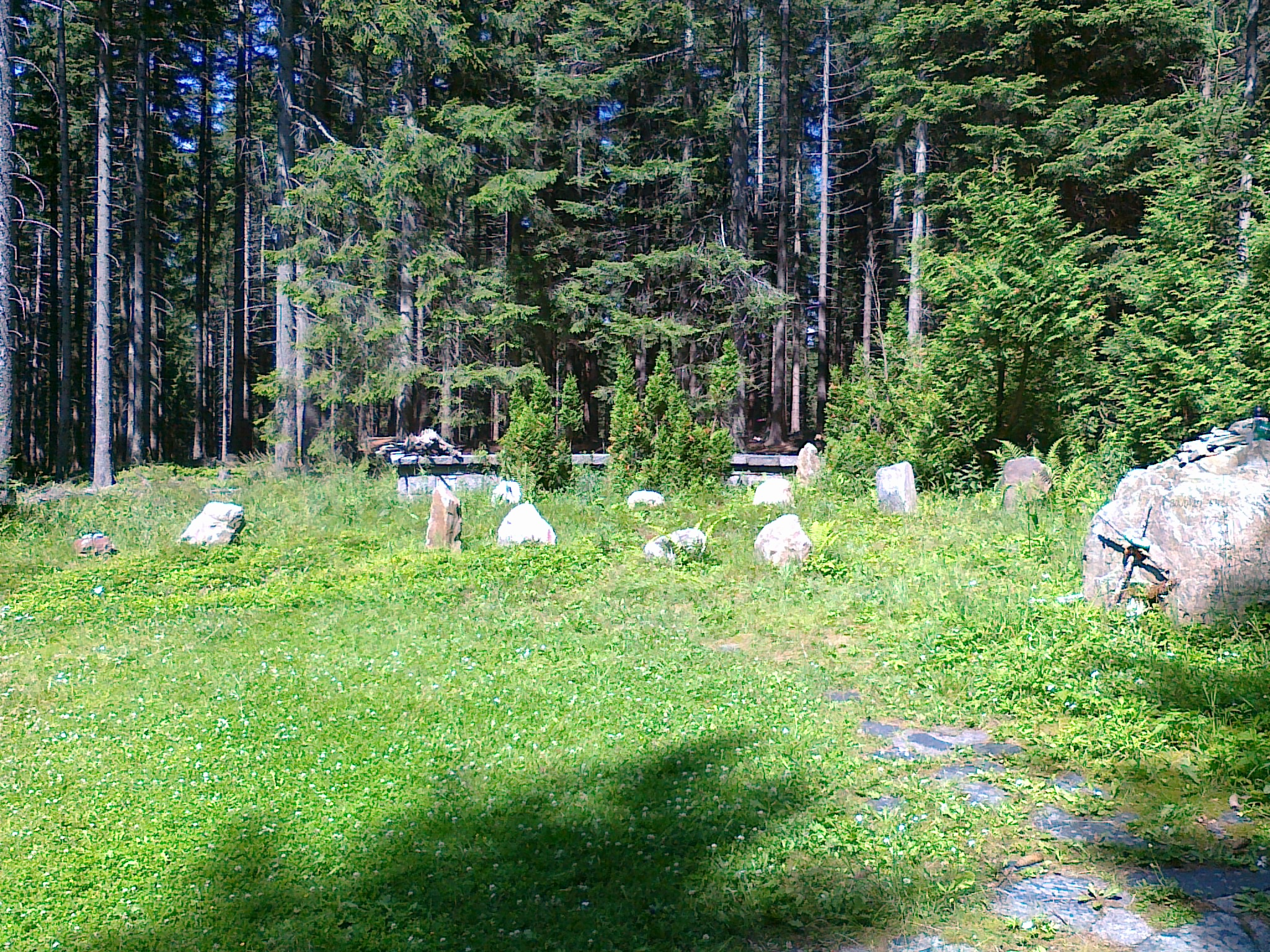
Forest cemetery of Russian prisoners of war on the slope of Orlík

At the base of the northwestern Žárný vrch slope, near the yellow tourist trail, close to a cabin named Opavská chata, about 2.3 km northwest of the summit, lies a forest cemetery (Czech: Lesní ruský hřbitov). It is the resting place of Russian prisoners of war who died of typhus between 1941 and 1943 while working during World War II. They were imprisoned in the Rejvíz camp, established near the cemetery, and their graves are marked with stones of varying sizes. The cemetery has been reconstructed multiple times, most recently in 1999. The cemetery holds the remains of 23 prisoners, as listed on a special informational plaque placed there.

=== Main summit ===
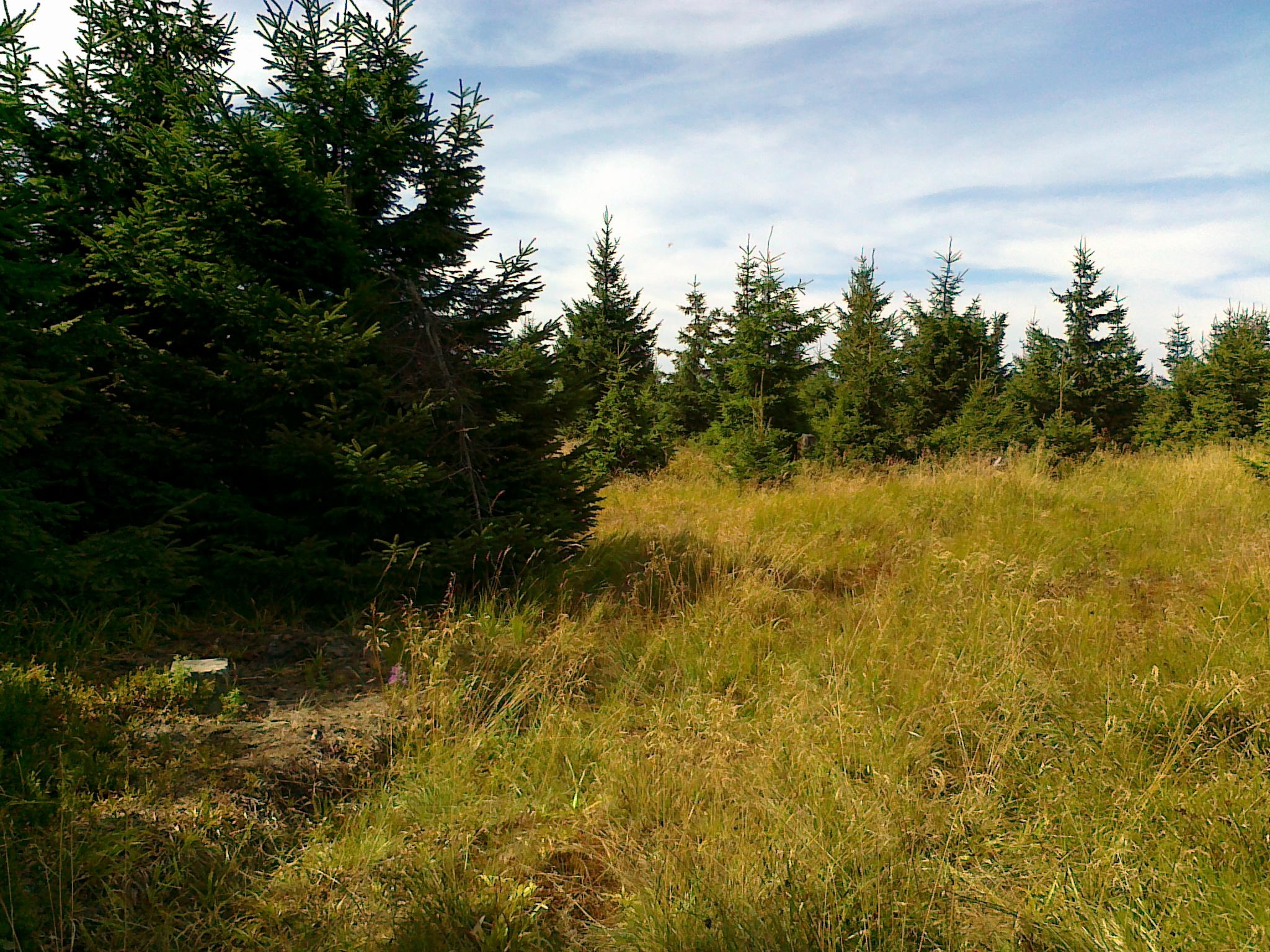
Summit area of Orlík with a visible triangulation station at the bottom left

There is no tourist trail leading to the peak. The summit area is forested with spruce, covered with alpine grass, and features a wooden fence to the east, erected by forestry services around a closed wildlife feeding area of about 0.3 km². Additionally, the summit area is at the intersection of field roads leading to neighboring peaks such as Medvědí vrch and Medvědí louka. Due to the increasing height of the forest over time, the summit area is not a viewpoint. At the summit, there is a triangulation station, marked on geodetic maps with the number 22, with an elevation of 1,203.58 meters above sea level and geographic coordinates 50°10′35.76″N 17°17′55.53″E.

The most convenient access to the summit is from the tourist intersection called Pásmo Orlíka, with an indicated elevation of 1,005 meters on the information board. Following the green tourist trail towards the Solná chata tourist stop, after about 900 meters, there is a path where one needs to turn left, covering a distance of about 560 meters to the peak of Medvědí louka, which has a characteristic exposed summit area. Continuing through this area for about 500 meters along a path marked by posts, there is an intersection, from where a visible field road through a clearing leads to the summit, approximately 900 meters away. An alternative route is also possible from the yellow tourist trail and the tourist intersection Kristovo loučení.

=== Secondary summits ===
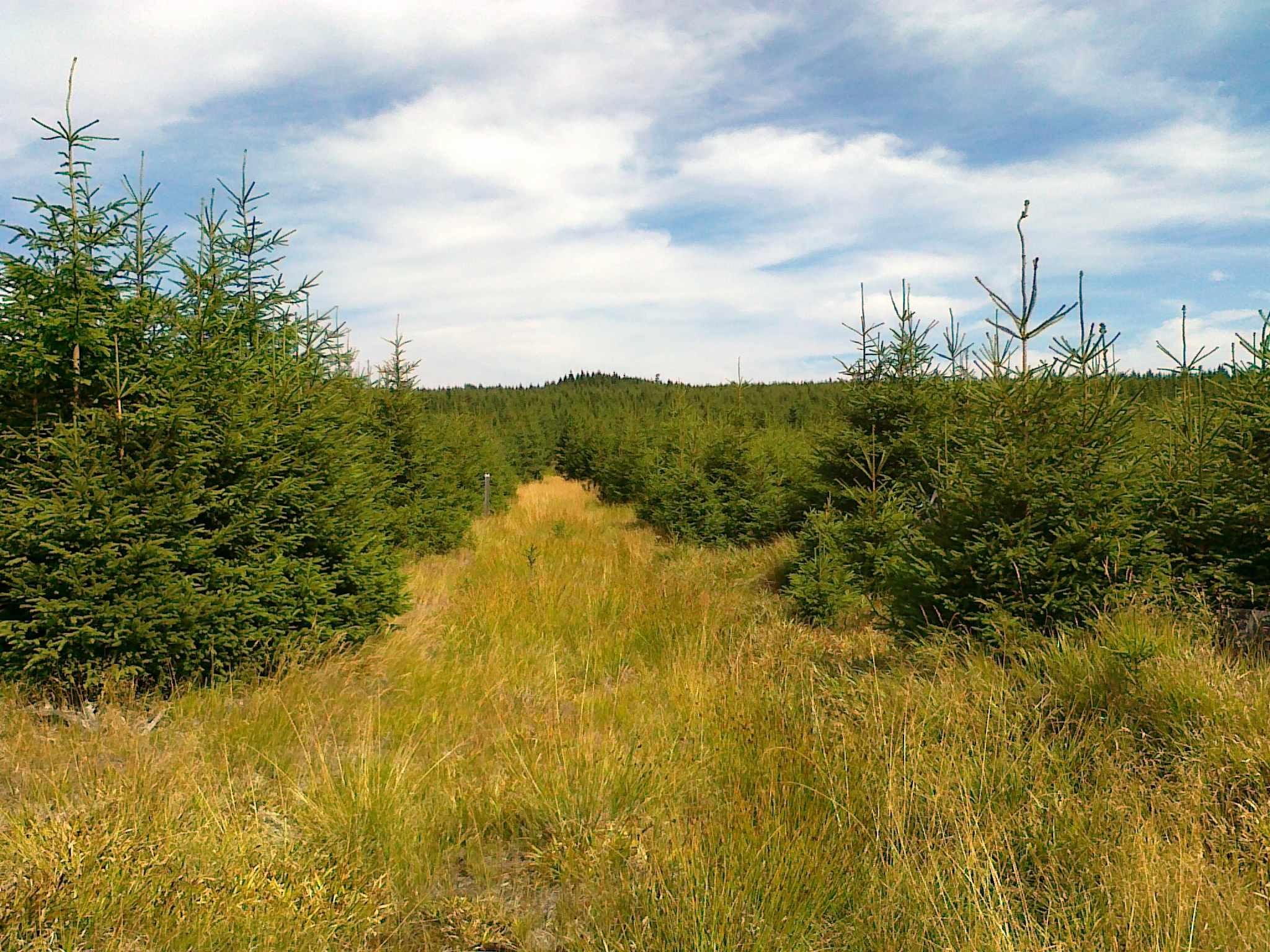
View from the path behind the summit area of Medvědí louka towards the secondary summit Orlík–SE

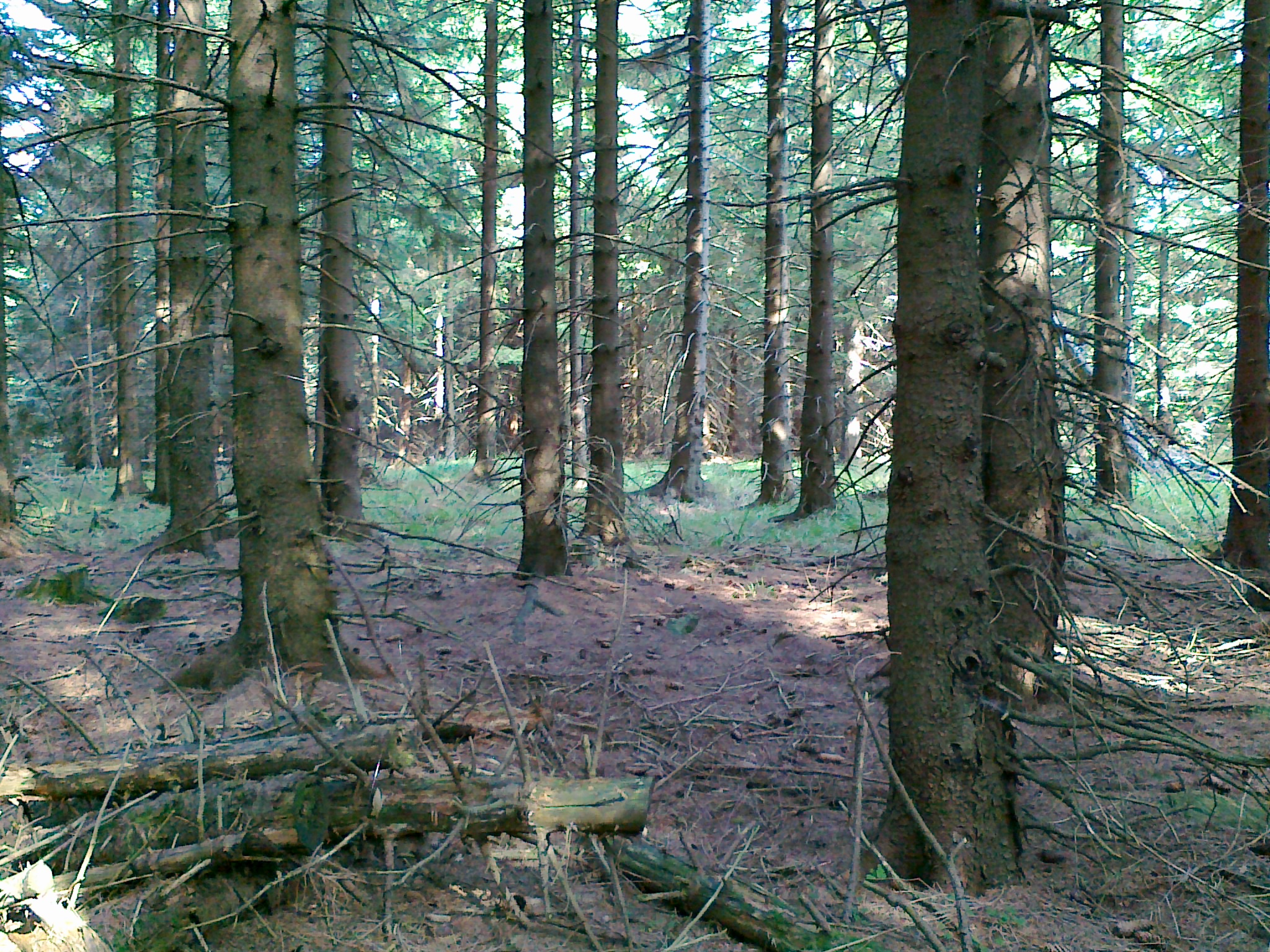
Summit area of the secondary summit Orlík–NW

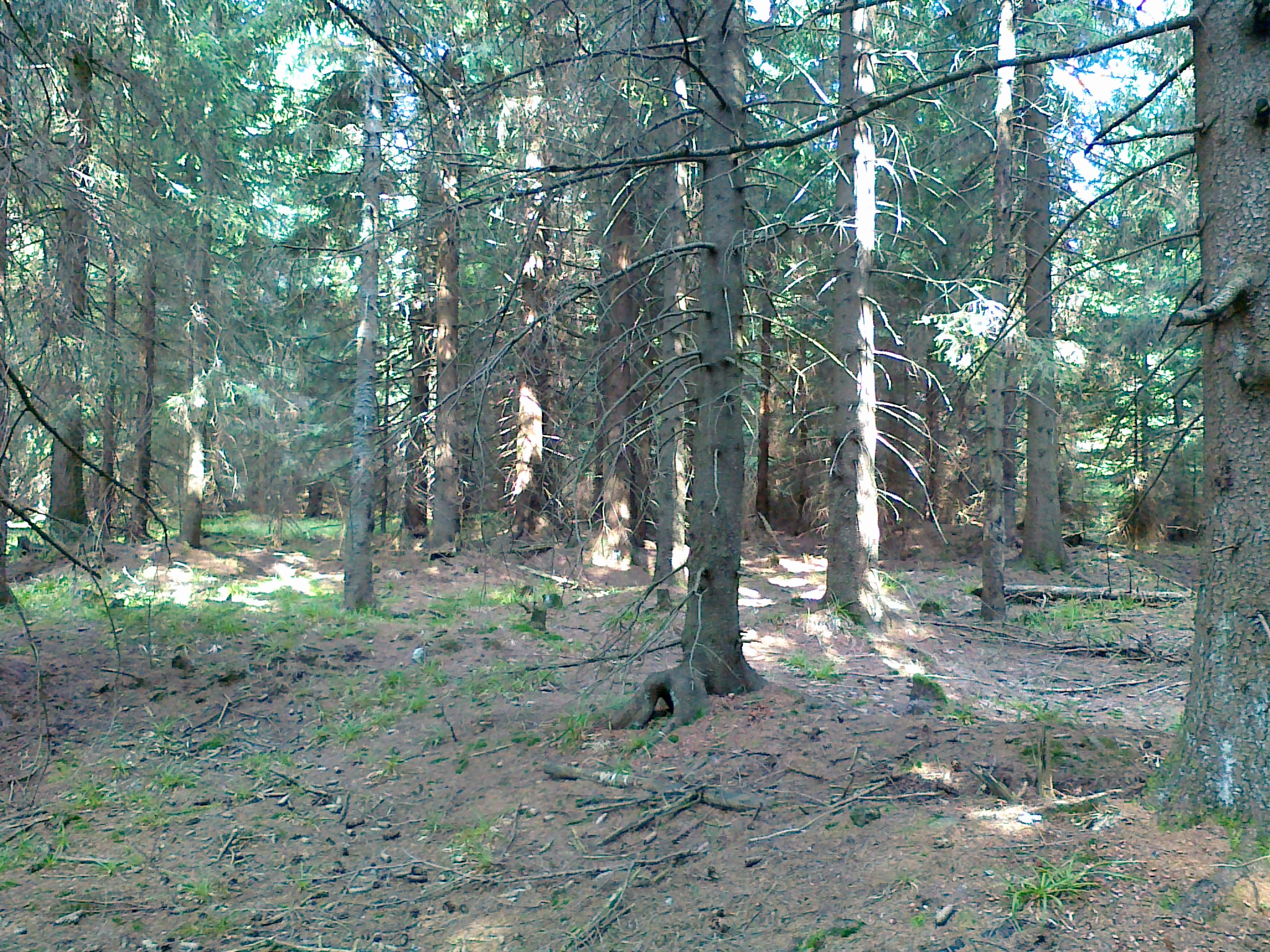
Summit area of the secondary summit Orlík–W

Within the entire massif of the mountain, apart from the main summit, there are three lower secondary summits.

Secondary summits of Orlík
Number	Summit	Elevation (meters above sea level)	Distance from main summit (kilometres)	Coordinates
1	Orlík–JV	1,138	0.87 southeast	50°10′09.1″N 17°18′15.1″E
2	Orlík–SZ	1,056	1.74 northwest	50°10′52.6″N 17°16′31.3″E
3	Orlík–Z	1,051	1.3 west	50°10′45.2″N 17°16′50.8″E

=== Geology ===
Geologically, Orlík belongs to the Desná Dome unit and is composed of metamorphic rocks, mainly blasto-mylonites, phyllites (muscovites, biotites, chlorites), gneisses, mica schists (graphites), and quartzites. It also contains sedimentary rocks, primarily meta-conglomerates and meta-aleurites, as well as igneous rocks, mainly meta-granitoids and meta-pegmatites.

=== Waters ===
Orlík summit

Climate chart (precipitation, max. and min. temperature)
J	F	M	A	M	J	J	A	S	O	N	D
38 −4 −9	35 −3 −9	51 1 −6	58 8 −2	100 13 3	101 15 6	115 18 8	91 18 8	66 13 4	38 9 0	46 2 −4	38 −3 −8
- █ Average max. and min. temperatures in °C
- █ Precipitation totals in mm
- Source: Climate Orlík. meteoblue.com
Imperial conversion
J	F	M	A	M	J	J	A	S	O	N	D
1.5 25 16	1.4 27 16	2 34 21	2.3 46 28	3.9 55 37	4 59 43	4.5 64 46	3.6 64 46	2.6 55 39	1.5 48 32	1.8 36 25	1.5 27 18
- █ Average max. and min. temperatures in °F
- █ Precipitation totals in inches

The summit and slopes of Orlík are located northeast of the European watershed, therefore belonging to the Baltic Sea watershed. The waters flow into the Baltic Sea, specifically into the Oder river basin, which is an extension of the mountain streams originating from this part of the Hrubý Jeseník mountains. Among these streams are the Podzámecký potok and Šumný potok, which flow near the mountain. From the western slope of the mountain, the Černá Opava stream originates, while from the eastern slope, the Slučí potok and Sokolí potok streams begin. Additionally, short, unnamed streams originate from the slopes, serving as tributaries to the aforementioned streams: Podzámecký potok, Šumný potok, Černá Opava, and Slučí potok. Due to the relatively gentle slopes, the mountain does not feature waterfalls or cascades.

== Nature protection ==
The entire mountain is within the protected area known as the Jeseníky Protected Landscape Area, established to protect geological formations, landforms, flora, and rare animal species.

== Tourism ==
=== Tourist trails ===
The Czech Tourist Club has marked two hiking trails in the area of the mountain:

Rejvíz – Rejvíz National Nature Reserve – Přední Jestřábí – Přední Jestřábí-JZ – Kazatelny-SV – Kazatelny – Orlík – Kristovo loučení pass – Medvědí louka – Ostruha–JV – Jelení loučky – Děrná – Ztracený vrch – Lysý vrch – Javorový vrch – Videlské sedlo pass – Kamzičí vrch – Malý Děd – Švýcárna mountain hut

Město Albrechtice – Česká Ves – Holčovice – Komorský potok stream valley – Komora – Končina – Heřmanovice – Hornické skály – Příčný vrch – Pod Ostrým – Zámecký vrch (1) – Orlík – Opavská chata mountain hut

=== Cycling and ski trails ===
Two cycling routes run through the slopes of the mountain:

Videlské sedlo – Javorový vrch – Lysý vrch – Ztracený vrch – Děrná – Ostruha–JV – Ostruha – Orlík – Kristovo loučení pass – Prameny Opavice pass – Příčný vrch – Lysý vrch – Zlaté Hory

Horní Lipová – Sněhulák – Strmý – Miroslav – Sedlo pod Javoříkem pass – Javořík – Javořík–SV – Nad Bobrovníkem – Adolfovice – Šumný potok stream valley – Dlouhá hora – Srnčí vrch – Orlík–SZ – Velké Bradlo–Z – Velké Bradlo – Pod Velkým Bradlem

During snowy periods, cross-country skiing trails follow the hiking and cycling routes. No downhill skiing routes have been established in the area of the mountain.
