= Javorový vrch =

Mountain in the Czech Republic

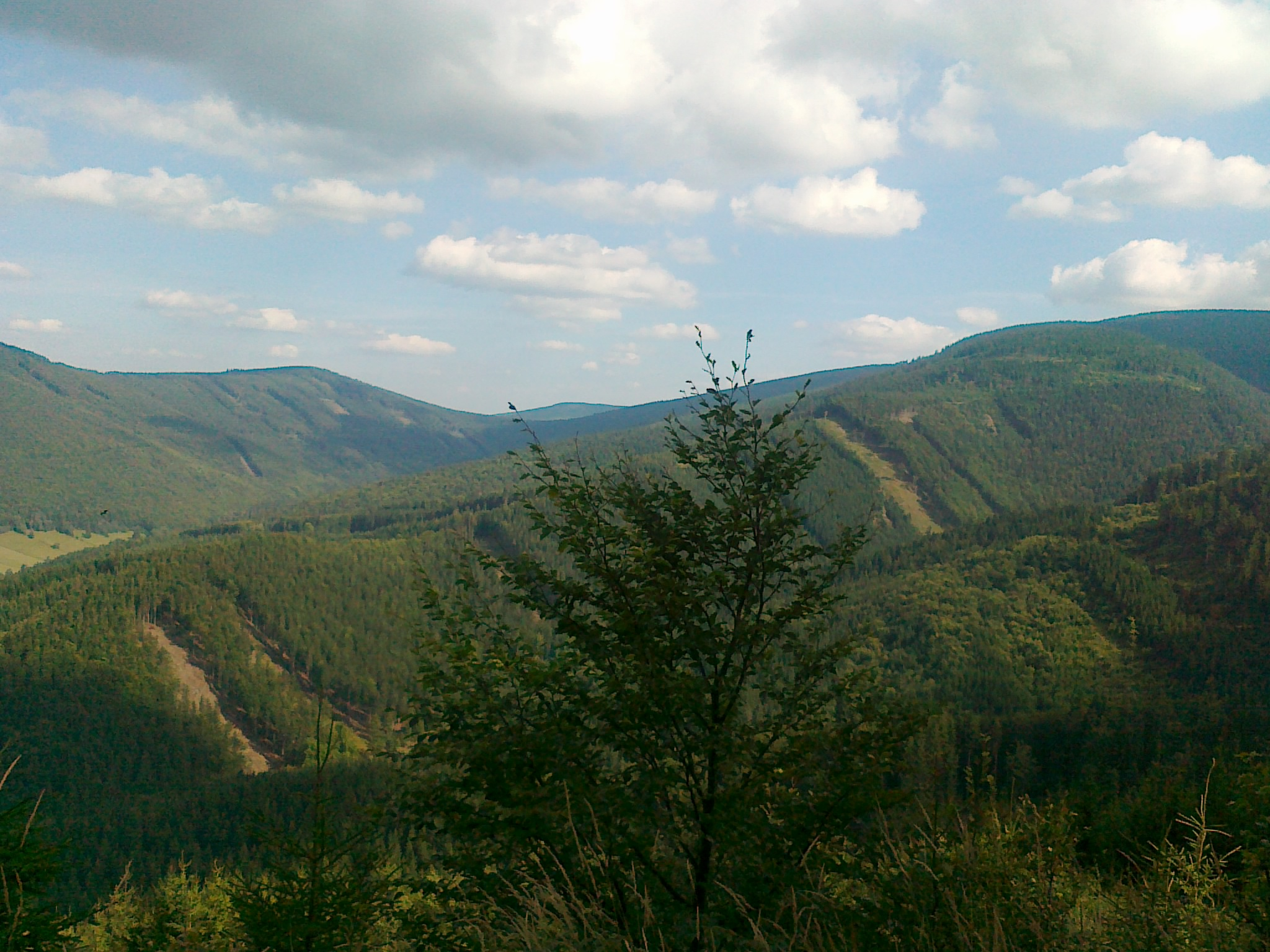
- View from the blue cycling trail at the slope of Velký Klín to the mountains: Javorový vrch, Lyra (in the distance) and Malý Děd

Highest point
- Elevation: 1,079 m (3,540 ft)
- Prominence: 72 m (236 ft)
- Coordinates: 50°7′18″N 17°14′51″E

Geography
- Location within Czech Republic
- Location: Bělá pod Pradědem
- Parent range: Hrubý Jeseník

Javorový vrch (formerly also known as Osikový vrch or Černá hora; German: Schwarze Berg) is a mountain in the Hrubý Jeseník mountain range in the Czech Republic. It has an elevation of 1,079 m (3,540 ft) above sea level. The summit and the western slopes are located in the municipality of Bělá pod Pradědem and the eastern slopes are located in the territory of Vrbno pod Pradědem.

== Characteristics ==
=== Location ===
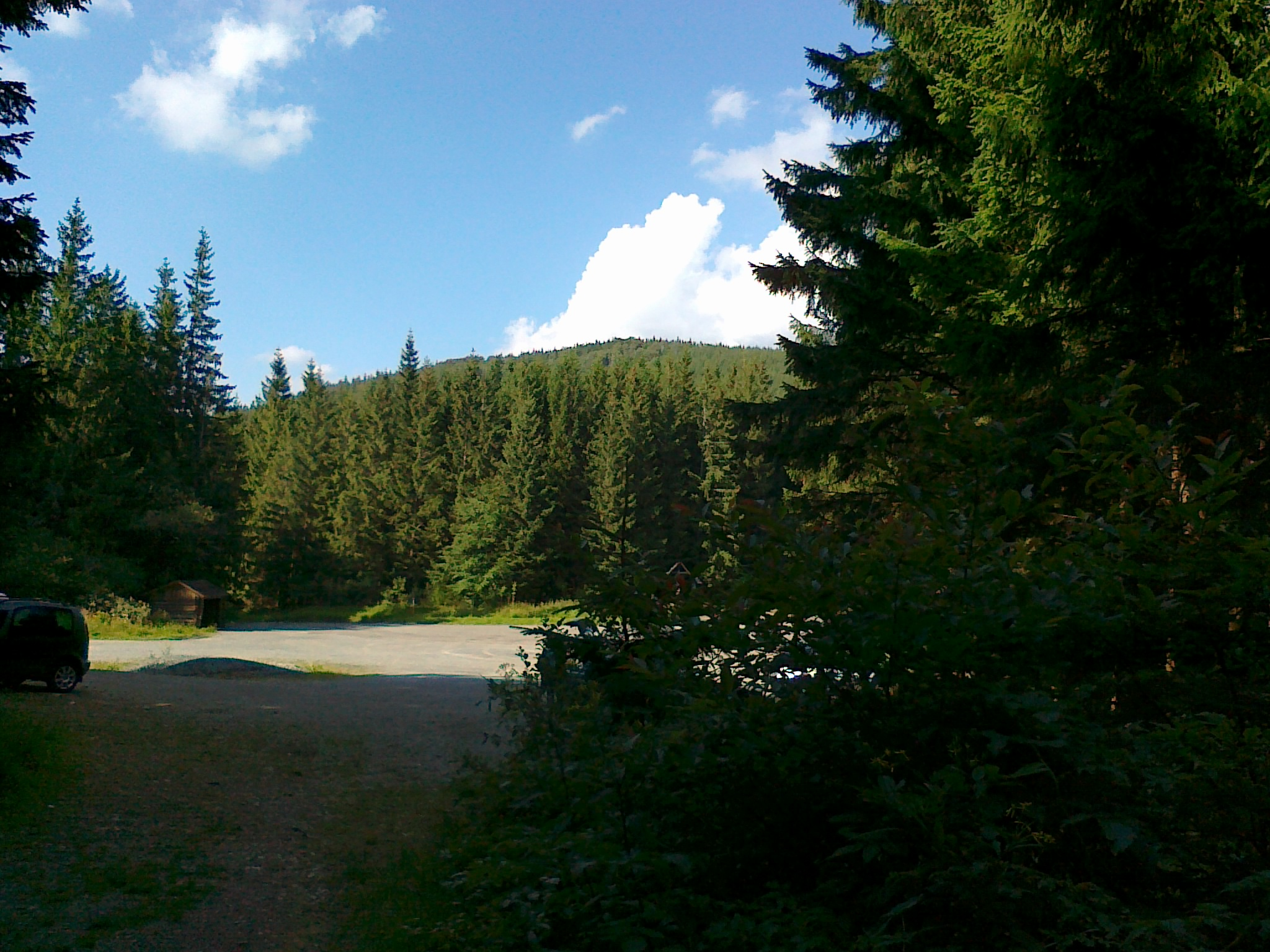
View of Javorový vrch from the Videlské sedlo pass

Javorový vrch is situated slightly to the northeast of the central part of the Hrubý Jeseník range, in the western area (microregion) known as the Medvědí Mountains, and borders the neighboring microregion called the Praděd Mountains. The mountain has a dome-shaped summit. The massif of the mountain has a slightly arched ridge, stretching in a southeast-northwest direction, lying nearby the settlements of Vidly and Bělá, close to roads no. 450 from Bělá pod Pradědem to Bruntál and no. 451 from Nové Heřminovy to Vidly. It is located on a side ridge of the Orlík Massif, between Lysý vrch and Mrazový vrch to Nad Borovým. The summit is not very visible, including from the road surrounding the summit of Praděd mountain (the summit is slightly to the left below the line of sight to Jelení loučky peak). From another characteristic viewpoint – the road around the summit of Dlouhé stráně mountain – it is not visible due to being obscured by Velký Jezerník mountain. Javorový vrch is visible, among other places, from the Videlské sedlo pass located near it.

The mountain is bounded by:

- the valley of the Bělá river to the southwest;
- a 1,007-meter-high pass towards the Lysý vrch–J summit to the northwest;
- the valley of the Skalní potok stream to the northeast;
- a small unnamed stream (a tributary of Skalní potok) flowing from a pass towards Mrazový vrch to the east;
- a 971-meter-high pass towards Mrazový vrch and the valley of the Střední Opava stream to the southeast;
- Videlské sedlo pass and the valley of the Česnekový potok stream to the south.

Surrounding the mountain are the following peaks:

- to the northwest, Skalnatý, Hřib, Lysý vrch–J, and Ztracený vrch;
- to the northeast, Děrná, Jelení loučky, Černý vrch, Karliny kameny, and Zlatá stráň;
- to the southeast, Mrazový vrch, Bučina, and Nad kapličkou;
- to the south, Sokol;
- to the southwest, Malý Děd, Kamzičí vrch, Nad Vodopádem, and Sokolí skála.

=== Slopes ===
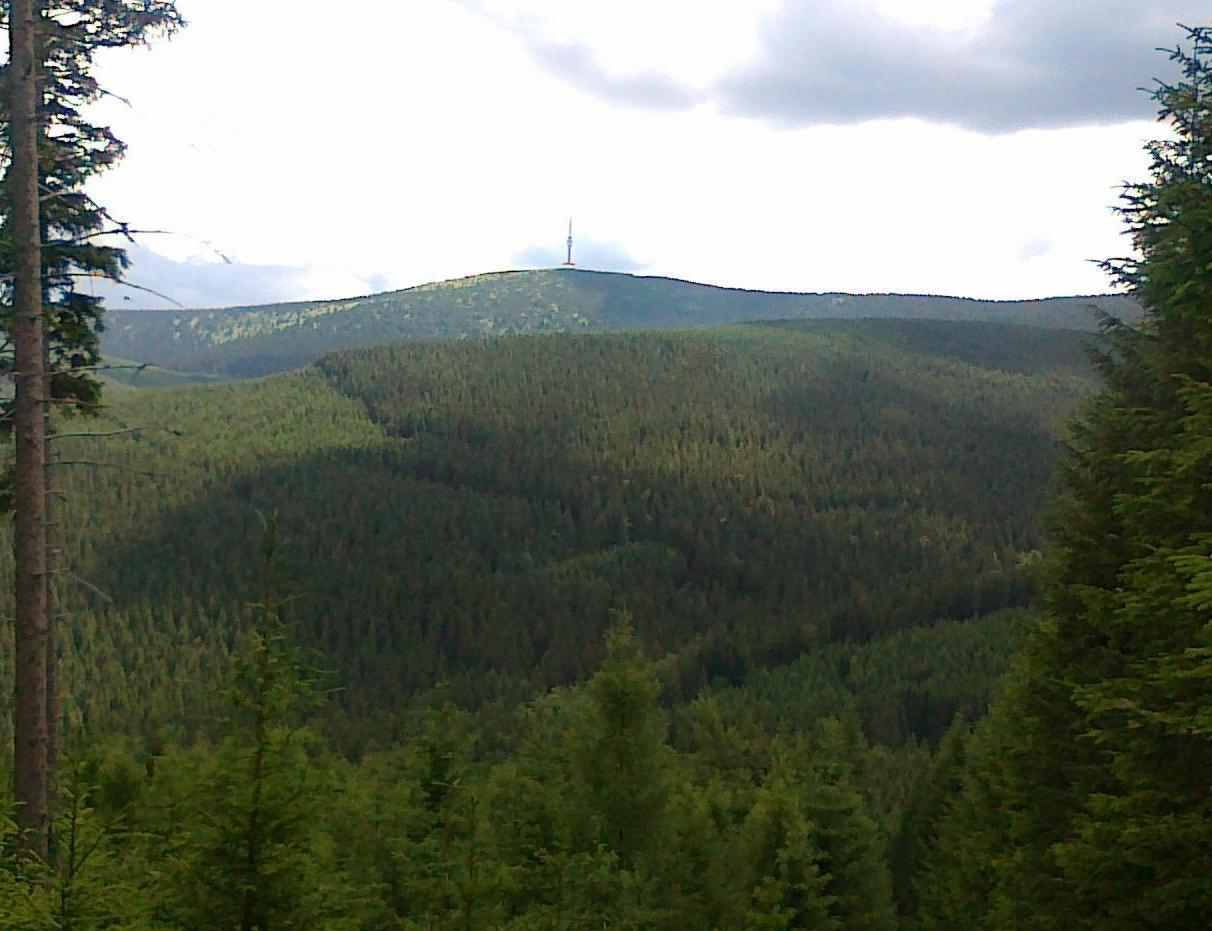
View from the slopes of Javorový vrch towards Praděd (Kamzičí vrch below)

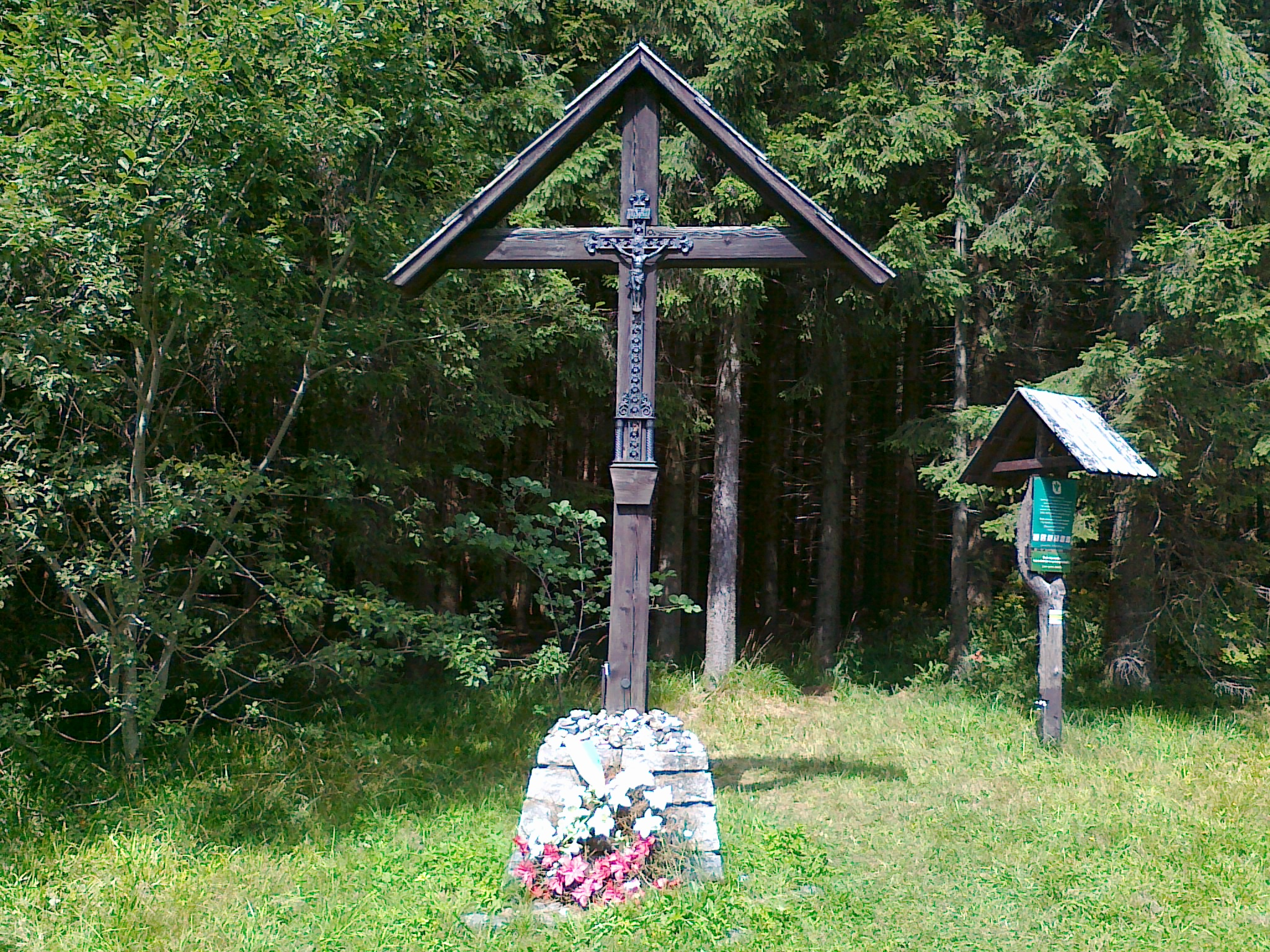
Cross at the foot of the southwestern slope on the Videlské sedlo pass

Within the mountain, six principal slopes can be distinguished:

- southwestern slope
- western slopes named Černá hora and Zlatá stráň
- northwestern slope
- northeastern slopes named V Říjišti and Na Bařinách
- eastern slope named Ve Stráni
- southeastern slopes named Pod Videlským křížem, Na Stráni, and Kotlina

All types of forestation can be found here: spruce forest, mixed forest, (Note: The forest stand of the entire Jeseníky Protected Landscape Area includes: European spruce 84%, European beech 10%, European larch 1.5%, sycamore maple 1.1%, birch 1%, common alder 0.8%, dwarf mountain pine 0.4%, grey alder 0.3%, (European silver fir, European ash, and linden) 0.2%, Scotch pine 0.1%, and others (Pinus mugo, oak, hornbeam, Norway maple, elm, rowan, green alder, aspen, poplar, and goat willow) 0.2%.) and deciduous forest, with spruce forest predominating. Almost all slopes, except the southwestern and northwestern ones, feature areas of mixed forest in addition to spruce forest, and as the elevation decreases on the western, eastern, and southeastern slopes, areas covered by deciduous forest appear. Additionally, meadows are found at the foot of the southeastern slope near the settlement of Vidly. Almost all slopes are characterized by considerable variability in the height of the forest, with occasional clearings (western slope), thinnings, and large glades. At the foot of the southeastern slope, near road no. 451 and the settlement of Vidly, a 22 kV overhead power line runs through. The slopes are devoid of rock formations or larger individual rocks. At the foot of the southwestern slope on the Videlské sedlo pass, an iron cross has been erected, attached to a wooden cross with a roof.

The slopes have relatively uneven, generally gentle, and varied inclinations. The average slope inclination ranges from 5° (northwestern and eastern slopes) to 19° (western slope). The average inclination of all slopes (weighted arithmetic mean of slope inclinations) is about 8°. The maximum average inclination of the western slope at an elevation of around 900 meters above sea level, near road no. 450, does not exceed 30° over a 50-meter section. Besides the roads no. 450 and no. 451 that pass through the mountain, the slopes are covered by a network of other roads (e.g., Bařinská cesta, K Dembaudě, or Zlatá stráň) as well as generally unmarked paths and trails.

=== Summit ===
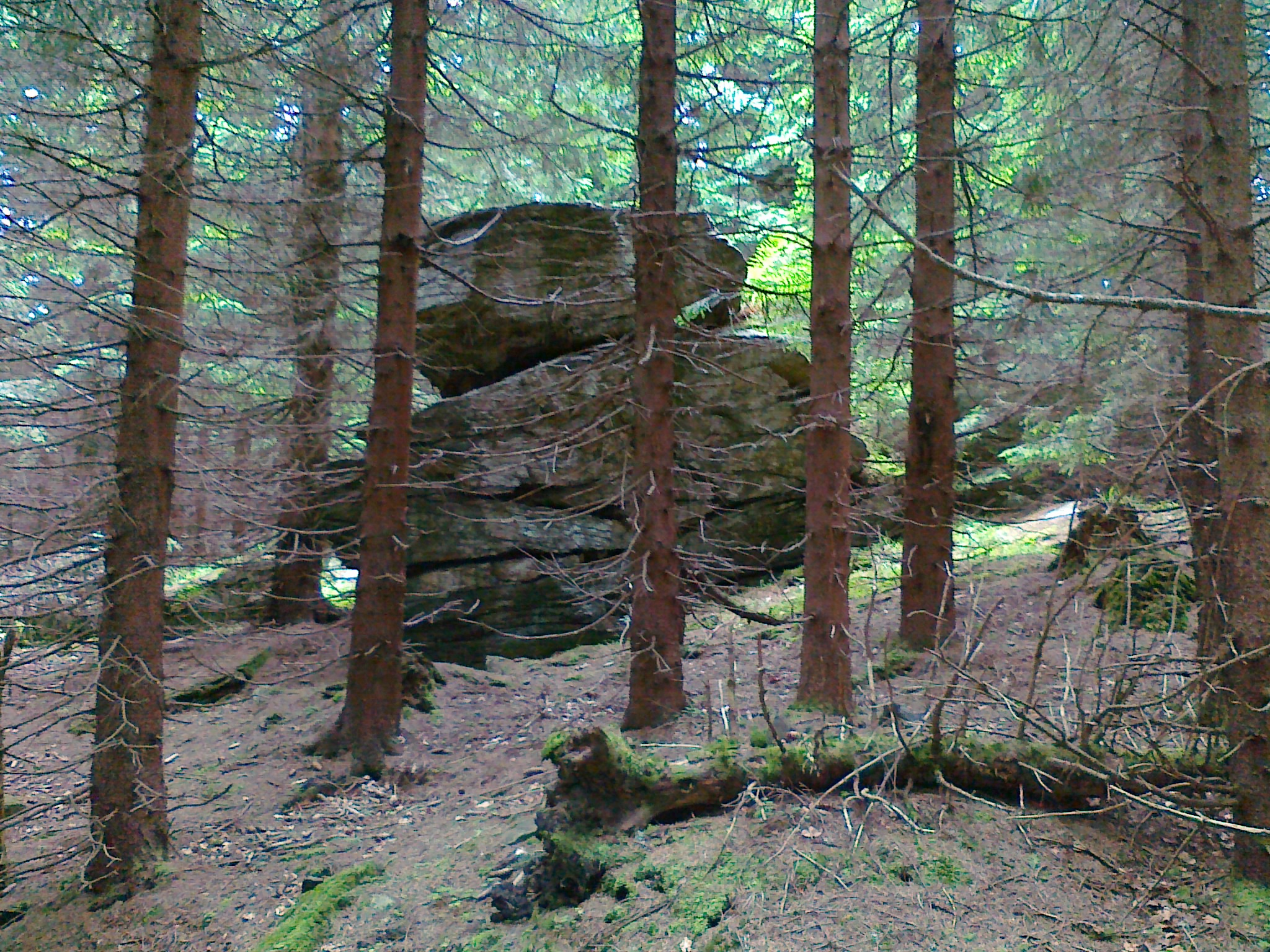
Summit rock formation on Javorový vrch

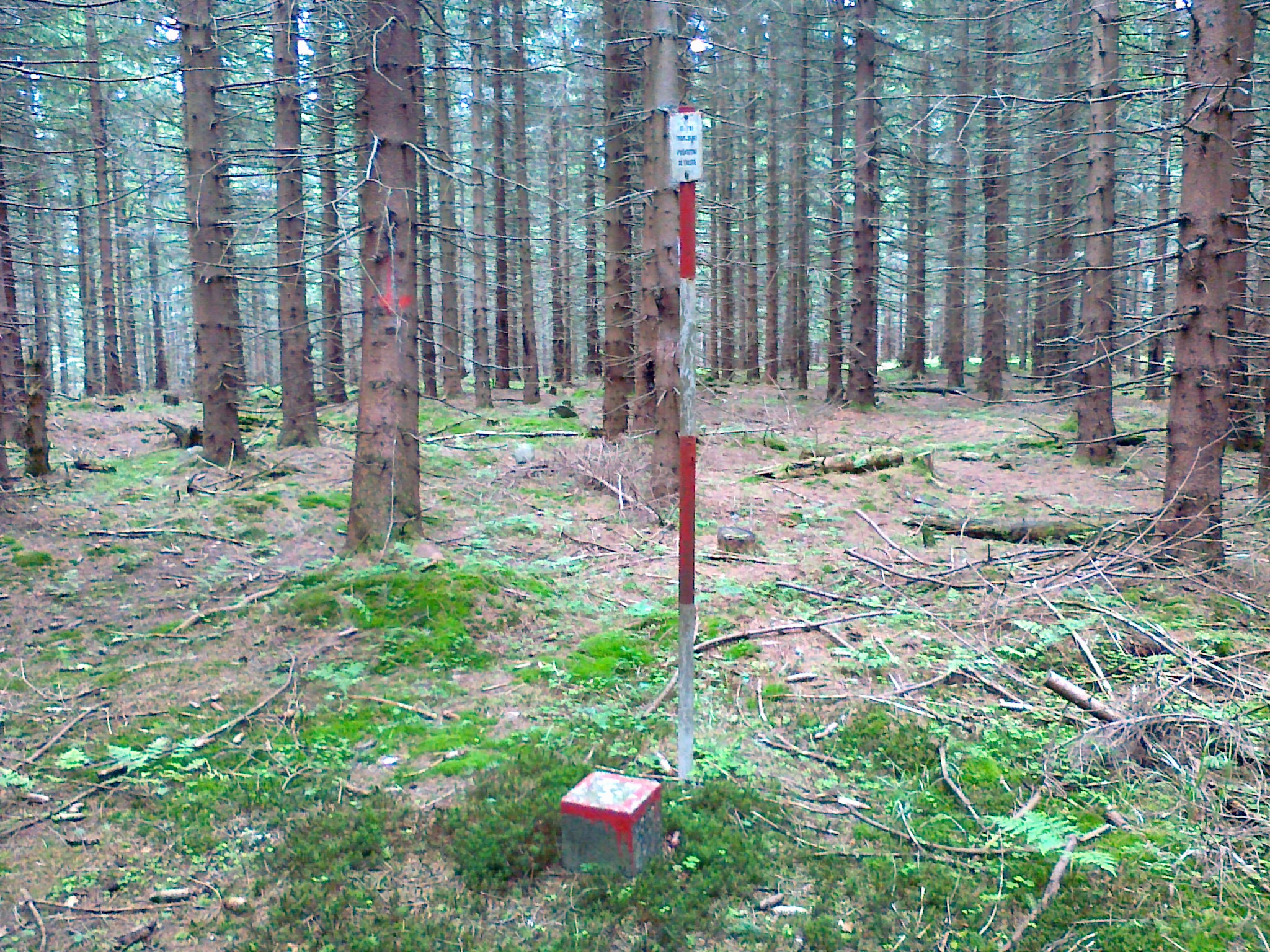
Triangulation station on the summit area of Javorový vrch

Javorový vrch is a solitary summit. There is no marked tourist trail leading to the summit, which itself is a small rocky outcrop located within dense spruce forest, covered by alpine grass. Due to the dense forest, the summit does not offer any panoramic views. On the summit area, there is a triangulation station established in 1937, marked on geodetic maps with the number 12, at an elevation of 1,076.28 meters above sea level, with geographical coordinates of 50°07′17.55″N 17°14′52.85″E. This station is located about 40 meters east of the summit, marked by a steel post painted with alternating white and red horizontal stripes, warning against its destruction with a sign reading Státní triangulace Poškození se trestá (State Triangulation – Damage is Punishable). The Czech Office for Surveying, Mapping, and Cadastre (CÚZK) in Prague reports the highest point of the mountain – the summit – at an elevation of 1,078.7 meters above sea level with coordinates 50°07′17.5″N 17°14′51.0″E.

Access to the summit begins at the Videlské sedlo pass. From this point, the route leads northeast along the yellow tourist trail for approximately 100 meters to a trail junction. From there, the path continues straight through a clearing, following an unmarked trail for 650 meters uphill until another trail intersection is reached. After a left turn, the path continues for about 170 meters to the summit area, where the summit rock is located roughly 100 meters to the left of the path.

=== Geology ===
Geologically, the massif of Javorový vrch belongs to the Desná Dome unit and is composed of metamorphic rocks, mainly blasto-mylonites (biotites, chlorites, and muscovites), igneous rocks, mainly meta-granitoids, and sedimentary rocks, mainly meta-conglomerates.

=== Waters ===
The summit and slopes of Javorový vrch are located to the northeast of the European watershed boundary, thus belonging to the Baltic Sea basin. The waters from this part of the Hrubý Jeseník range flow into the Oder river basin, fed by mountain streams near the mountain, including the Bělá, Skalní potok, Střední Opava, and Česnekový potok streams. Several short, unnamed streams, tributaries of the Skalní potok and Česnekový potok streams, originate from the slopes of Javorový vrch. On the eastern slope, at an elevation of about 990 meters above sea level, there is a small marshy area. Additionally, on the western slope, about 800 meters northwest of the summit, at an elevation of about 860 meters above sea level, lies a spring called Studánka Pod Videlským sedlem, located near the Zlatá stráň road, about 100 meters from the higher loop of road no. 450. Due to the relatively gentle slopes, there are no waterfalls or cascades on the mountain.

== Nature preservation ==
The summit and its slopes are located within a designated protected area known as the Jeseníky Protected Landscape Area, established to protect rock formations, landforms, plant life, and rare animal species.
