= Alpinocottus volki =

Conservation status
- Least Concern (IUCN 3.1)

Scientific classification
- Kingdom: Animalia
- Phylum: Chordata
- Class: Actinopterygii
- Order: Perciformes
- Suborder: Cottoidei
- Family: Cottidae
- Genus: Alpinocottus
- Species: A. volki

Binomial name
- Alpinocottus volki Taranetz, 1933

Synonyms
- Cottus minutus volki Taranetz, 1933; Cottus poecilopus volki Taranetz, 1933

Species of fish

Alpinocottus volki is a species of freshwater ray-finned fish belonging to the family Cottidae, the typical sculpins. This species is endemic to Russia where it is found along the continental coasts of the Sea of Japan but not on the coasts of Peter the Great Bay. It reaches a maximum length of 13 cm (5.1 in). It was previously considered a subspecies of the alpine bullhead (A. poecilopus) and this species was first formally described in 1933 by the Russian ichthyologist Anatoly Yakovlevich Taranetz as Cottus poecilopus volki with its type locality given as the Suchan River to Takema River on western coast of the Sea of Japan in Primorye.

== Etymology ==
Taranetz did not identify the person honoured in the specific name but it is thought most likely to be his friend Alexander Maksimovich Volk, like Taranetz, Volk was killed in action during World War 2.
