= Opavice =

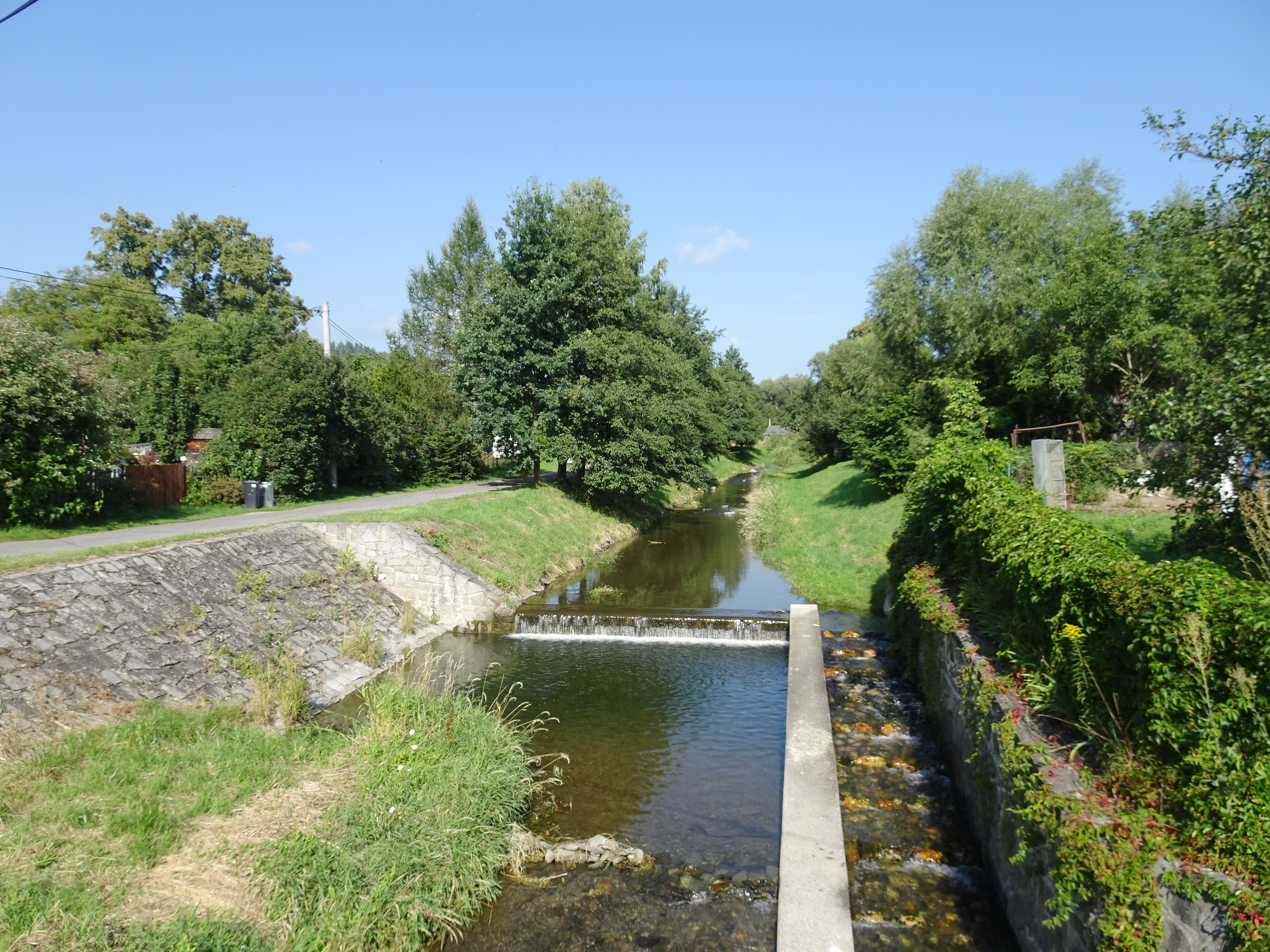
- The Opavice in Město Albrechtice

Location
- Countries: Czech Republic; Poland
- Regions/ Voivodeships: Moravian-Silesian; Opole

Physical characteristics
- Source
  - location: Heřmanovice, Zlatohorská Highlands
  - coordinates: 50°12′35″N 17°23′7″E
  - elevation: 840 m (2,760 ft)
- Mouth
  - location: Opava
  - coordinates: 50°5′46″N 17°42′58″E
  - elevation: 309 m (1,014 ft)
- Length: 35.7 km (22.2 mi)
- Basin size: 212 km^{2} (82 sq mi)
- Discharge
  - average: 1.51 m^{3}/s (53 cu ft/s) near estuary

Basin features
- Progression: Opava→ Oder→ Baltic Sea

The Opavice (Polish: Opawica) is a river in the Czech Republic, a left tributary of the Opava River. It flows through the Moravian-Silesian Region. It is 35.7 km (22.2 mi) long. Part of the river forms the Czech–Polish state border.

== Etymology ==
The name Opavice is a diminutive of 'Opava'.

== Characteristic ==
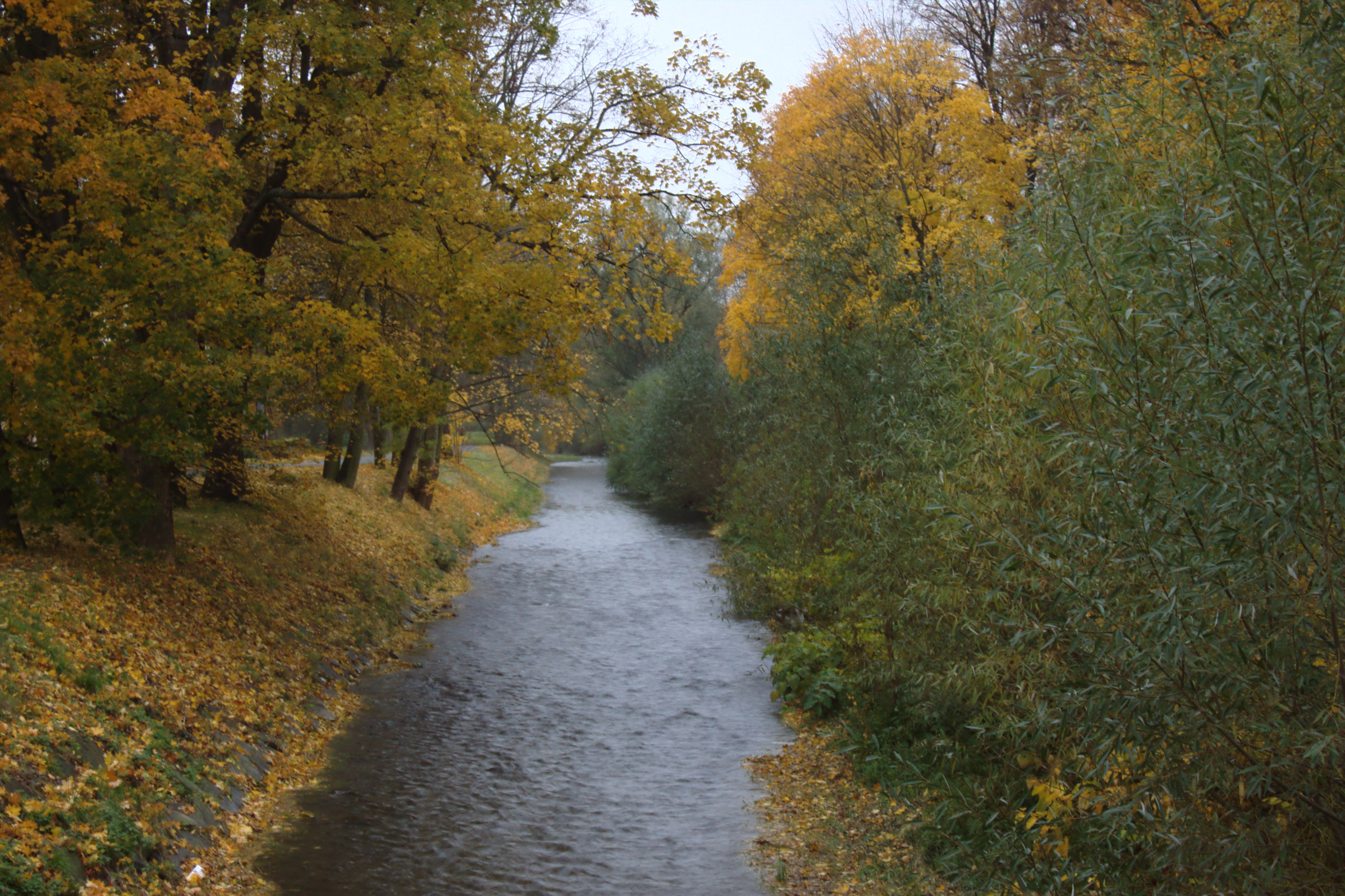
The Opavice on the Czech–Polish border

The Opavice originates in the territory of Heřmanovice in the Zlatohorská Highlands range at an elevation of 840 m (2,760 ft) and flows to Krnov, where it enters the Opava River at an elevation of 309 m (1,014 ft). It is 35.7 km (22.2 mi) long, of which about 5.4 km (3.4 mi) forms the state border between the Czech Republic and Poland. Its drainage basin has an area of about 212 km^{2} (82 sq mi), of which 193.7 km^{2} (74.8 sq mi) is in the Czech Republic. The average discharge at 1.7 river km (before the confluence with the Radynka) is 1.29 m^{3}/s (46 cu ft/s).

The longest tributaries of the Opavice are:

Tributary	Length (km)	Side
Kobylí potok	12.1	right
Radynka / Mohla	9.5	left
Komorský potok	6.3	left
Solný potok	6.1	left
Valštejnský potok	6.0	left

== Course ==
The river flows through the municipal territories of Heřmanovice, Holčovice, Město Albrechtice and Krnov. The section on the Czech–Polish border is adjacent to Gmina Głubczyce.

== Nature ==
Among the protected species of animals that live in the river are the European crayfish and the fish common minnow, European bullhead and alpine bullhead. The lower course of the river is also a hunting ground for the common kingfisher.

== See also ==
- List of rivers of the Czech Republic
