= Herrmannstadt =

Herrmannstadt is a common misspelling of Hermannstadt that is the German name for the following cities:

- Sibiu in Transylvania/Sibiu County (Romania).
- Heřmanovice in Moravia/Okres Bruntál (Czech Republic).
