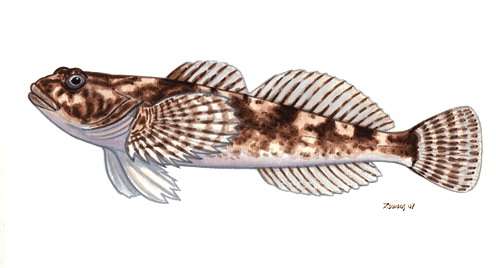
- Alpinocottus poecilopus

Scientific classification
- Kingdom: Animalia
- Phylum: Chordata
- Class: Actinopterygii
- Division: Teleostei
- Order: Perciformes
- Suborder: Cottoidei
- Family: Cottidae
- Genus: Alpinocottus; Bogdanov, 2023

Type species
- Cottus poecilopus Heckel, 1840

= Alpinocottus =

Genus of fishes

Alpinocottus is a genus of freshwater ray-finned fishes belonging to the family Cottidae, the typical sculpins. These fishes are found in Northeast Asia.

== Species ==
There are currently four recognized species in this genus:

- Alpinocottus kuznetzovi (Berg, 1903)
- Alpinocottus poecilopus (Heckel, 1837) (Alpine bullhead)
- Alpinocottus szanaga (Dybowski, 1869)
- Alpinocottus volki (Taranetz, 1933)
