= Alpinocottus kuznetzovi =

Conservation status
- Least Concern (IUCN 3.1)

Scientific classification
- Kingdom: Animalia
- Phylum: Chordata
- Class: Actinopterygii
- Division: Teleostei
- Order: Perciformes
- Suborder: Cottoidei
- Family: Cottidae
- Genus: Alpinocottus
- Species: A. kuznetzovi

Binomial name
- Alpinocottus kuznetzovi (Berg, 1903)

Synonyms
- Cottus kuznetzovi

Species of fish

Alpinocottus kuznetzovi is a species of freshwater ray-finned fish belonging to the family Cottidae, the typical sculpins. It inhabits the Lena River system in eastern Siberia in Russia. It reaches a maximum length of 9.1 cm (3.6 in).
