= Nové Heřminovy =

- Municipality
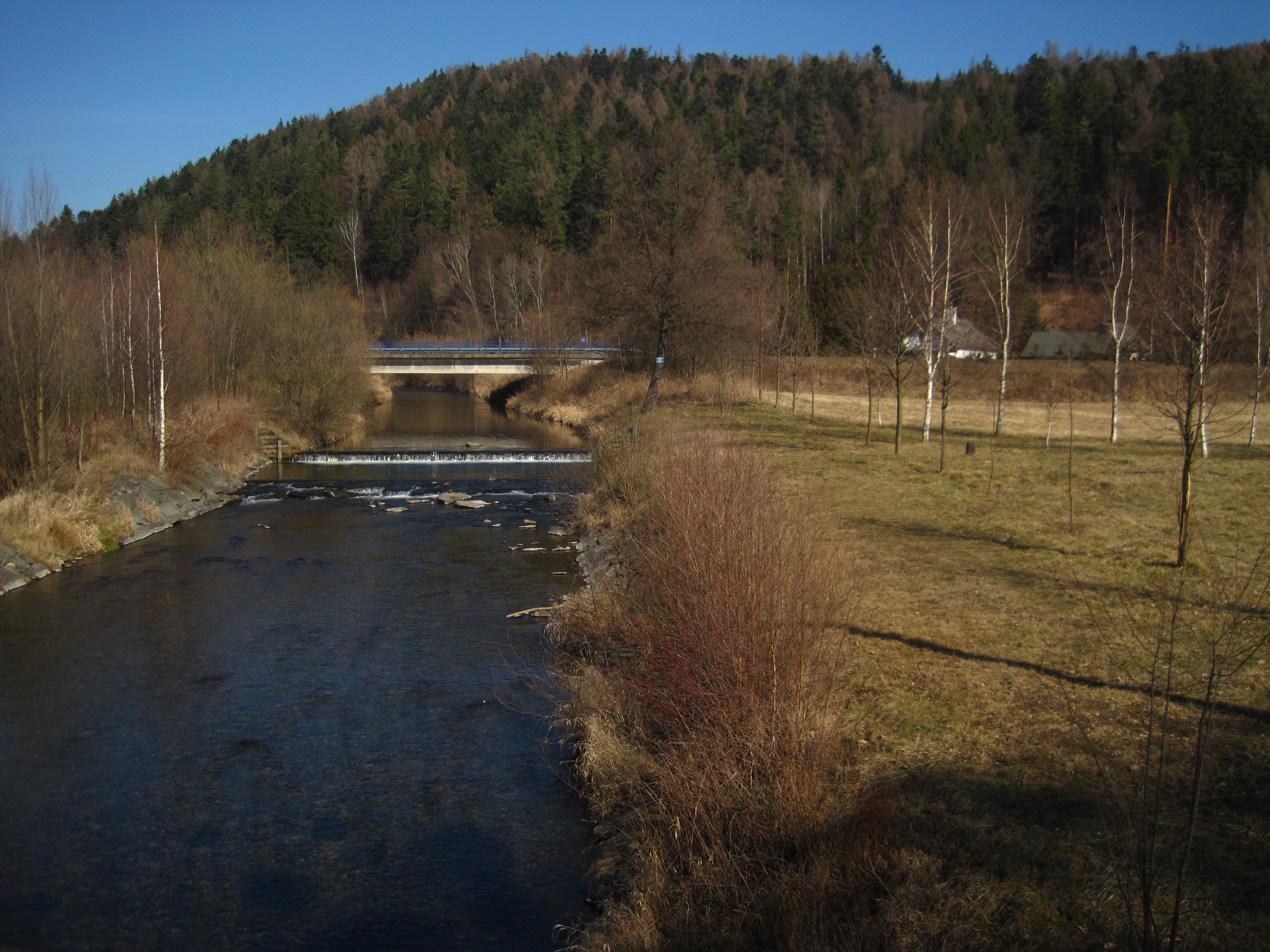
- Opava River in Nové Heřminovy

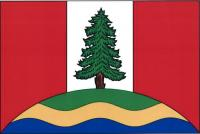
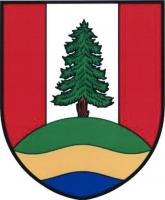
- Flag Coat of arms

- Location in the Czech Republic
- Coordinates: 50°1′25″N 17°31′42″E
- Country: Czech Republic
- Region: Moravian-Silesian
- District: Bruntál
- First mentioned: 1406

Area
  - Total: 11.03 km^{2} (4.26 sq mi)
- Elevation: 392 m (1,286 ft)

Population (2026-01-01)
  - Total: 321
  - Density: 29.1/km^{2} (75.4/sq mi)
- Time zone: UTC+1 (CET)
  - Summer (DST): UTC+2 (CEST)
- Postal code: 792 01
- Website: www.noveherminovy.eu

Nové Heřminovy (German: Neu Erbersdorf) is a municipality and village in Bruntál District in the Moravian-Silesian Region of the Czech Republic. It has about 300 inhabitants.

== Administrative division ==
Nové Heřminovy consists of two municipal parts (in brackets population according to the 2021 census):

- Nové Heřminovy (236)
- Kunov (93)

== Geography ==
Nové Heřminovy is located about 6 kilometres (4 mi) northeast of Bruntál and 54 km (34 mi) northwest of Ostrava, in the historical region of Czech Silesia. It lies in the Nízký Jeseník range. The highest point is the hill Střelná at 591 m (1,939 ft) above sea level.

The Opava River flows through the municipality. The Nové Heřminovy Reservoir with an area of about 130 ha (320 acres) is planned to be built on the river.

== History ==
The first written mention of Nové Heřminovy is from 1406. It was part of the Duchy of Krnov. The village greatly suffered during the Thirty Years' War and Napoleonic Wars. The railway was built in 1871, which helped the further development of the village.

In 2019, Kunov, previously a municipal part of Bruntál, was joined to the municipality.

== Demographics ==
Historical population

Year	Pop.	±%
1869	821	—
1880	860	+4.8%
1890	936	+8.8%
1900	937	+0.1%
1910	1,252	+33.6%

Year	Pop.	±%
1921	852	−31.9%
1930	1,278	+50.0%
1950	389	−69.6%
1961	767	+97.2%
1970	682	−11.1%

Year	Pop.	±%
1980	511	−25.1%
1991	385	−24.7%
2001	425	+10.4%
2011	345	−18.8%
2021	329	−4.6%

Source: Censuses (Note: Including Kunov, which has been part of Bruntál since 2019.)

== Transport ==
The I/45 road from Bruntál to Krnov runs through the municipality.

Nové Heřminovy is located on a railway line of local importance heading from Vrbno pod Pradědem to Milotice nad Opavou.

== Sights ==
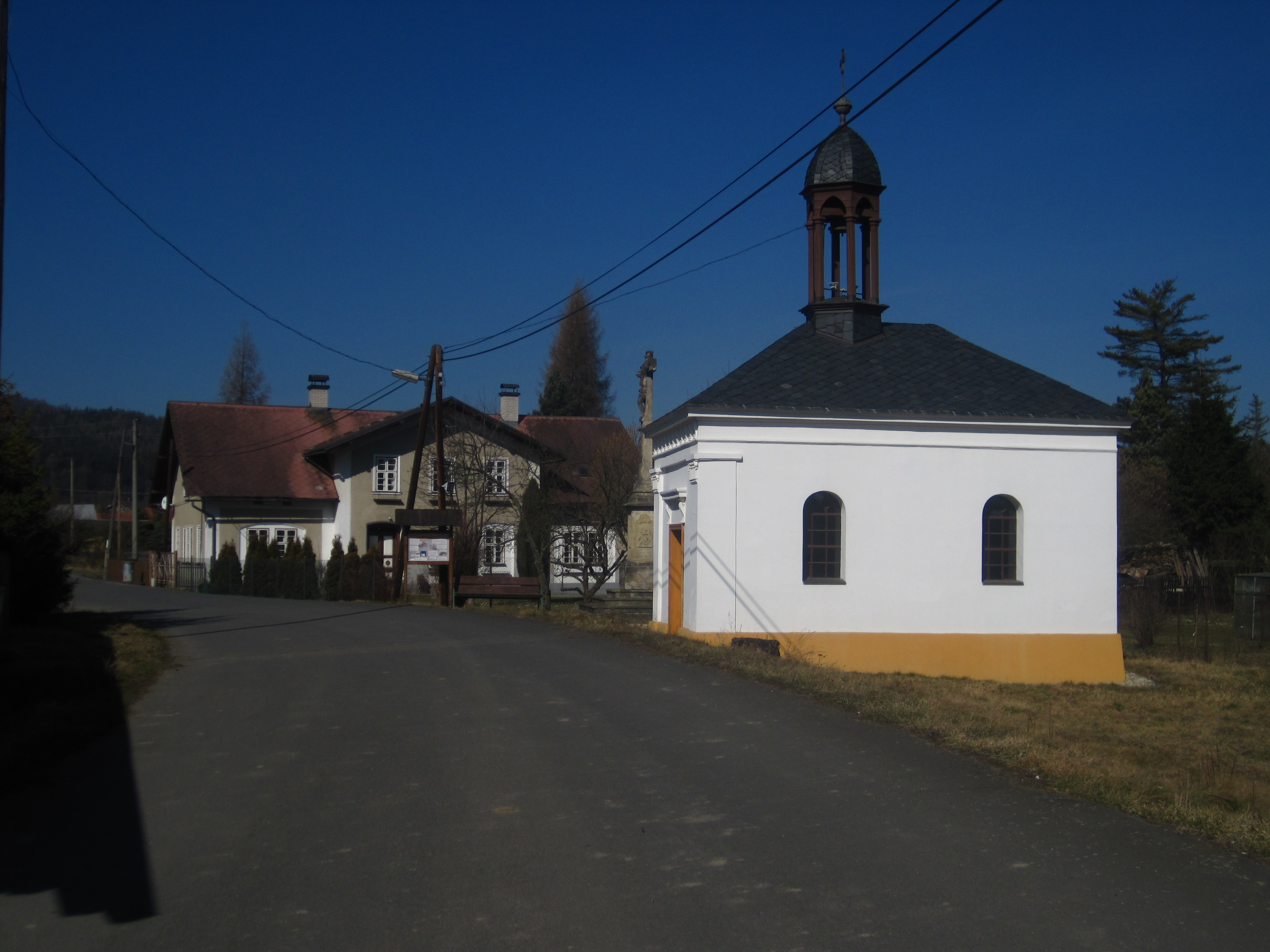
Chapel of the Holy Trinity

The main landmark of Nové Heřminovy is the Chapel of the Holy Trinity. It was built in the Neoclassical style, probably in the mid-19th century. Next to the chapel is a stone wayside cross dating from 1733.
