= Alpinocottus szanaga =

Conservation status
- Least Concern (IUCN 3.1)

Scientific classification
- Kingdom: Animalia
- Phylum: Chordata
- Class: Actinopterygii
- Order: Perciformes
- Suborder: Cottoidei
- Family: Cottidae
- Genus: Alpinocottus
- Species: A. szanaga

Binomial name
- Alpinocottus szanaga (Dybowski, 1869)

Synonyms
- Cottus szanaga

Species of fish

Alpinocottus szanaga is a species of freshwater ray-finned fish belonging to the family Cottidae, the typical sculpins. It is found in Mongolia and Russia. It reaches a maximum length of 8.2 cm (3.2 in). This species was first formally described in 1869 by the Polish naturalist Benedykt Dybowski with its type locality given as the Onon River in the Amur River drainage basin of Russia. The specific name szanaga is derived from Szanaga-sagasu, meaning "spoon fish" the Buryat dialect word for this fish in the Amur basin.
