= Opava (river) =

River in the Czech Republic and Poland

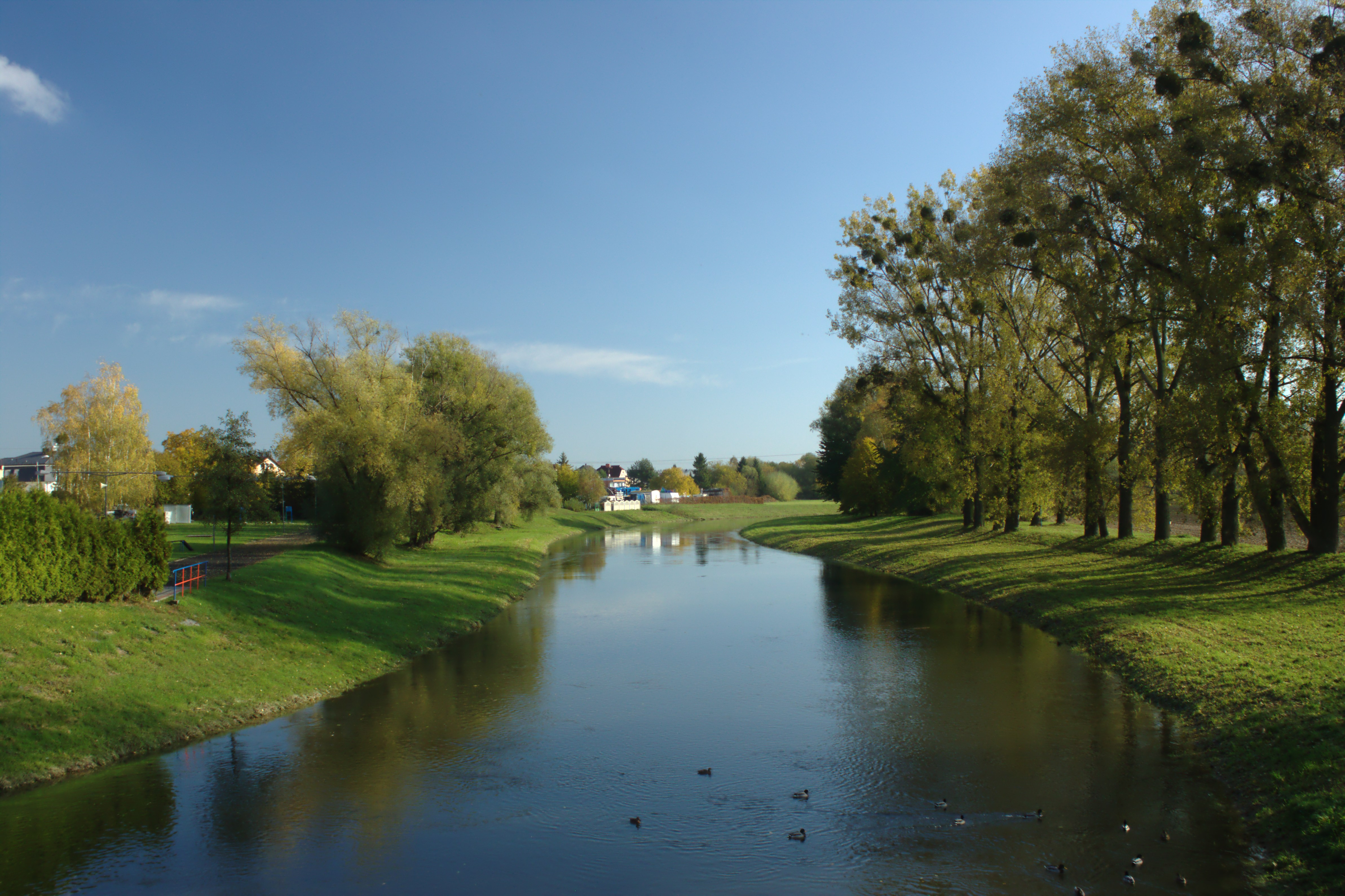
- The Opava in Kravaře

Location
- Countries: Czech Republic; Poland
- Regions/ Voivodeships: Moravian-Silesian; Opole

Physical characteristics
- Source: Černá Opava
  - location: Zlaté Hory, Hrubý Jeseník
  - coordinates: 50°10′44″N 17°17′24″E
  - elevation: 1,062 m (3,484 ft)
- Mouth
  - location: Oder
  - coordinates: 49°50′1″N 18°13′17″E
  - elevation: 207 m (679 ft)
- Length: 129.3 km (80.3 mi)
- Basin size: 2,088.8 km^{2} (806.5 sq mi)
- Discharge
  - average: 17.6 m^{3}/s (620 cu ft/s) near estuary

Basin features
- Progression: Oder→ Baltic Sea

The Opava (Czech pronunciation: [ˈopava]; Polish: Opawa, German: Oppa) is a river in the Czech Republic, a left tributary of the Oder River. It partly forms the Czech–Polish state border. It flows through the Moravian-Silesian Region in the Czech Republic and along the Opole Voivodeship in Poland. It is formed by the confluence of the Černá Opava and Střední Opava streams. Together with the Černá Opava, which is its main source, the Opava is 129.3 km (80.3 mi) long, making it the 15th longest river in the country. Without the Černá Opava, it is 110.7 km (68.8 mi) long.

== Etymology ==
The first written mentions of the river are from 1031 (as Vpa) and 1062 (as Opa). The words apa, opa were Celtic words for 'water' or 'river'. The suffix -ava is of younger origin and also denotes 'water'. The source streams of the Opava are called Černá Opava ('black Opava'), Střední Opava ('middle Opava') and Bílá Opava ('white Opava').

== Characteristic ==
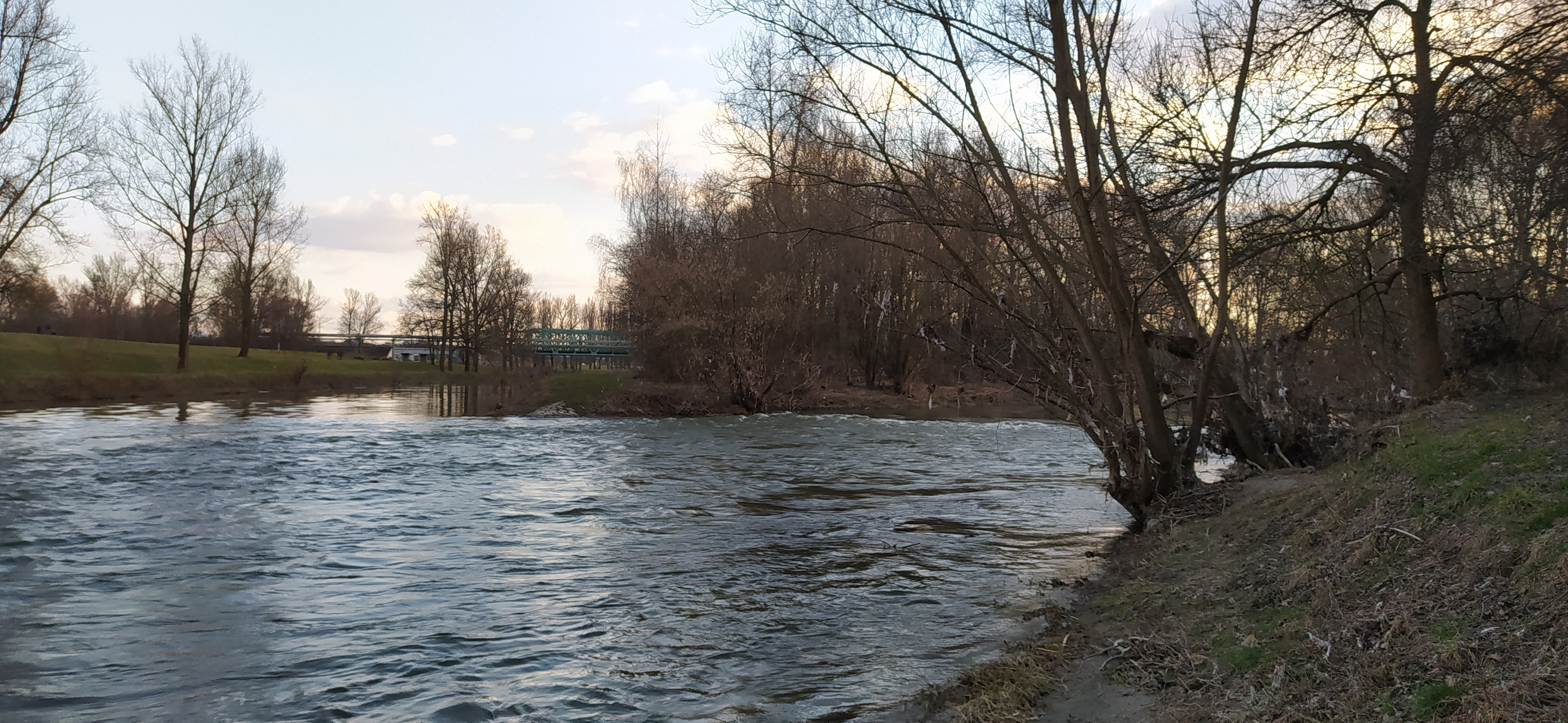
Confluence of the Opava (right) and Oder

From a water management point of view, the Opava, Černá Opava and Střední Opava are three different watercourses with separate numbering of river kilometres. The Opava itself is formed by the confluence of the Černá Opava and Střední Opava in the territory of Vrbno pod Pradědem at an elevation of 529 m (1,736 ft), and is 110.7 km (68.8 mi) long. The stream of Bílá Opava flows to the Střední Opava shortly before its confluence with the Černá Opava and is also considered the source of the Opava.

In a broader point of view, the Opava (as Černá Opava) originates in the territory of Zlaté Hory in the Hrubý Jeseník mountain range, on the slope of the Orlík mountain at an elevation of 1,062 m (3,484 ft), and flows to Ostrava, where it enters the Oder River at an elevation of 207 m (679 ft). It is 129.3 km (80.3 mi) long, making it the 15th longest river in the country. The river forms 21.8 km (13.5 mi) of the Czech–Polish border. Its drainage basin has an area of 2,088.8 km^{2} (806.5 sq mi), of which 1,813.7 km^{2} (700.3 sq mi) is in the Czech Republic.

The sources and longest tributaries of the Opava are:

Tributary	Length (km)	River km	Side
Moravice	100.5	35.4	right
Opavice	35.7	71.6	left
Čižina	23.0	56.3	right
Heraltický potok	18.7	51.1	left
Černá Opava	18.6	110.7	–
Velká	17.2	38.8	right
Krasovka	14.6	80.4	left
Střední Opava	12.9	110.7	right

== Course ==
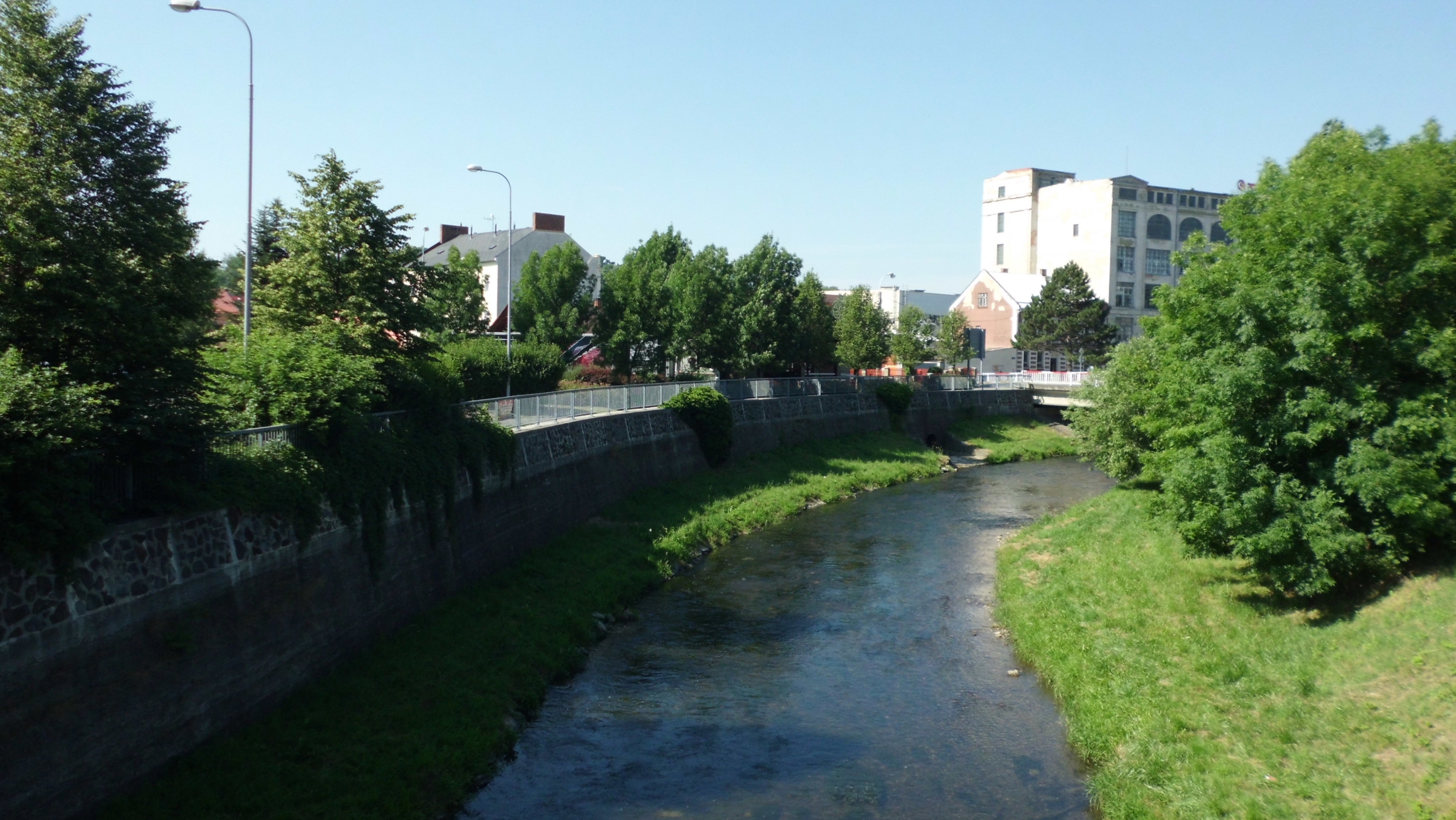
The Opava in Krnov

The most notable settlement on the river are the cities of Ostrava and Opava, named after the river. The river flows through the municipal territories of Vrbno pod Pradědem, Karlovice, Široká Niva, Nové Heřminovy, Zátor, Brantice, Krnov, Úvalno, Brumovice, Holasovice, Opava, Velké Hoštice, Kravaře, Štítina, Mokré Lazce, Háj ve Slezsku, Dolní Benešov, Kozmice, Dobroslavice, Děhylov, Hlučín and Ostrava.

In the section between Krnov and Opava, where the river forms most of the Czech–Polish state border, the river flows along the territory of Gmina Branice.

== Bodies of water ==
There are no reservoirs and fishponds built directly on the Opava. There are 754 bodies of water in the basin area. The largest of them is the Slezská Harta Reservoir with an area of 840 ha (2,100 acres).

== Fauna ==
Common fish in the river include river trout, grayling and common barbel. Among the protected species of fish and lampreys are the common minnow, European bullhead, alpine bullhead and brook lamprey, occurring on the upper course of the river. Among the protected animal species occurring in the lower course of the river are the European crayfish, painter's mussel, swollen river mussel and duck mussel. The entire course of the river is also a nesting and hunting ground for the common kingfisher.

== Tourism ==
The Opava is suitable for river tourism. The most popular part is the lower section of the river from Kravaře to Ostrava with a length of about 30 km (19 mi), which is passable all year round and is suitable for less experienced paddlers.
