= Heřmanovice =

- Municipality
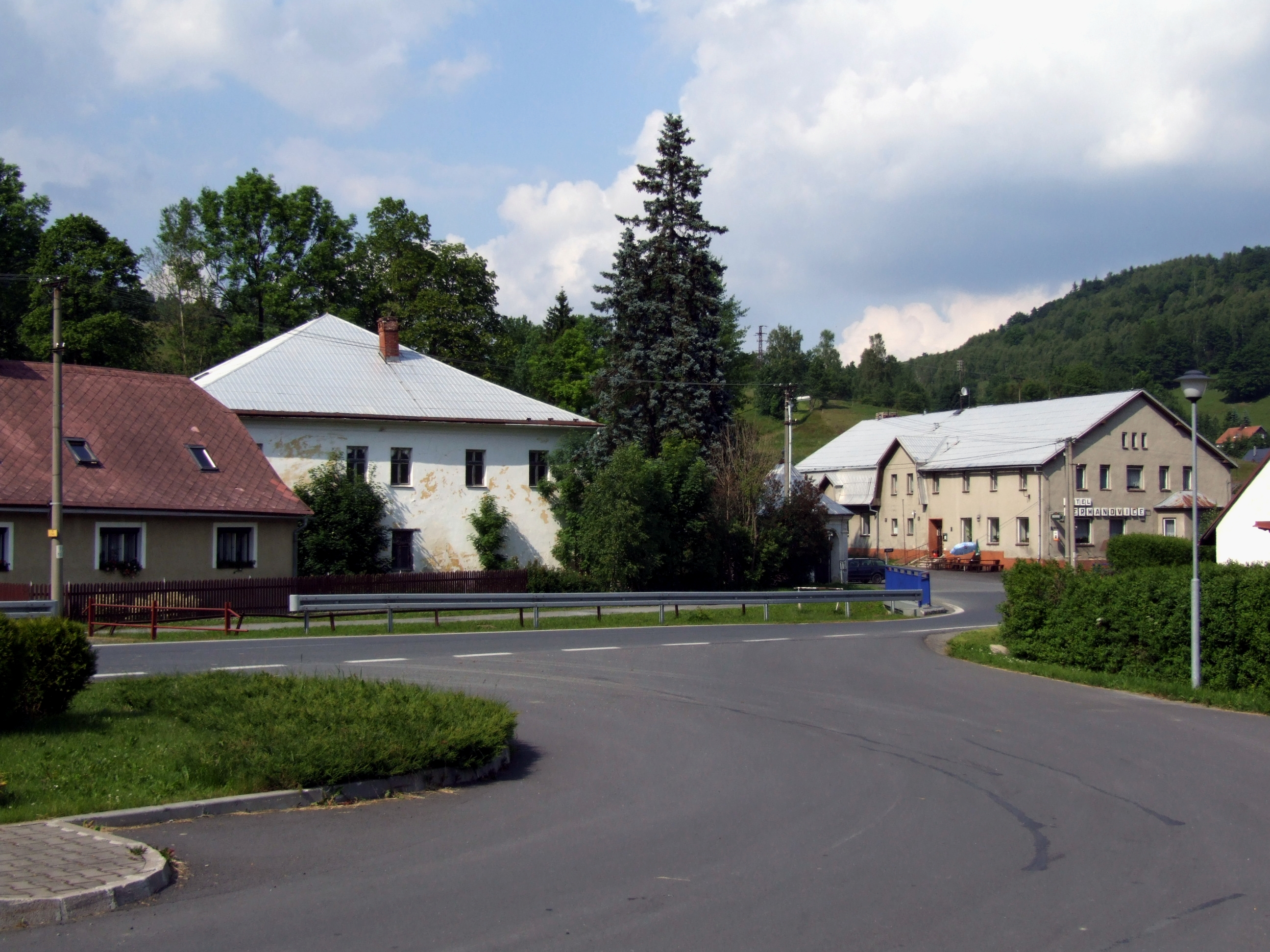
- Centre of Heřmanovice

- Location in the Czech Republic
- Coordinates: 50°11′36″N 17°23′52″E
- Country: Czech Republic
- Region: Moravian-Silesian
- District: Bruntál
- First mentioned: 1339

Area
  - Total: 42.79 km^{2} (16.52 sq mi)
- Elevation: 615 m (2,018 ft)

Population (2026-01-01)
  - Total: 328
  - Density: 7.67/km^{2} (19.9/sq mi)
- Time zone: UTC+1 (CET)
  - Summer (DST): UTC+2 (CEST)
- Postal code: 793 74
- Website: www.hermanovice.cz

Heřmanovice (German: Hermannstadt) is a municipality and village in Bruntál District in the Moravian-Silesian Region of the Czech Republic. It has about 300 inhabitants. The Opavice River originates in the municipality and flows through the village proper.

== History ==
The first written mention of Heřmanovice is from 1339.

From 1938 to 1945, the municipality was annexed by Nazi Germany and administered as part of the Reichsgau Sudetenland. After World War II, most of the German-speaking population was expelled and the village depopulated.

== Demographics ==
Historical population
| Year | Pop. | ±% |
|---|---|---|
| 1869 | 2,768 | — |
| 1880 | 2,663 | −3.8% |
| 1890 | 2,390 | −10.3% |
| 1900 | 2,393 | +0.1% |
| 1910 | 2,266 | −5.3% |
| 1921 | 2,101 | −7.3% |
| 1930 | 2,187 | +4.1% |
| 1950 | 415 | −81.0% |
| 1961 | 601 | +44.8% |
| 1970 | 566 | −5.8% |
| 1980 | 521 | −8.0% |
| 1991 | 440 | −15.5% |
| 2001 | 411 | −6.6% |
| 2011 | 351 | −14.6% |
| 2021 | 286 | −18.5% |
Source: Censuses
