= Vrbno pod Pradědem =

- Town
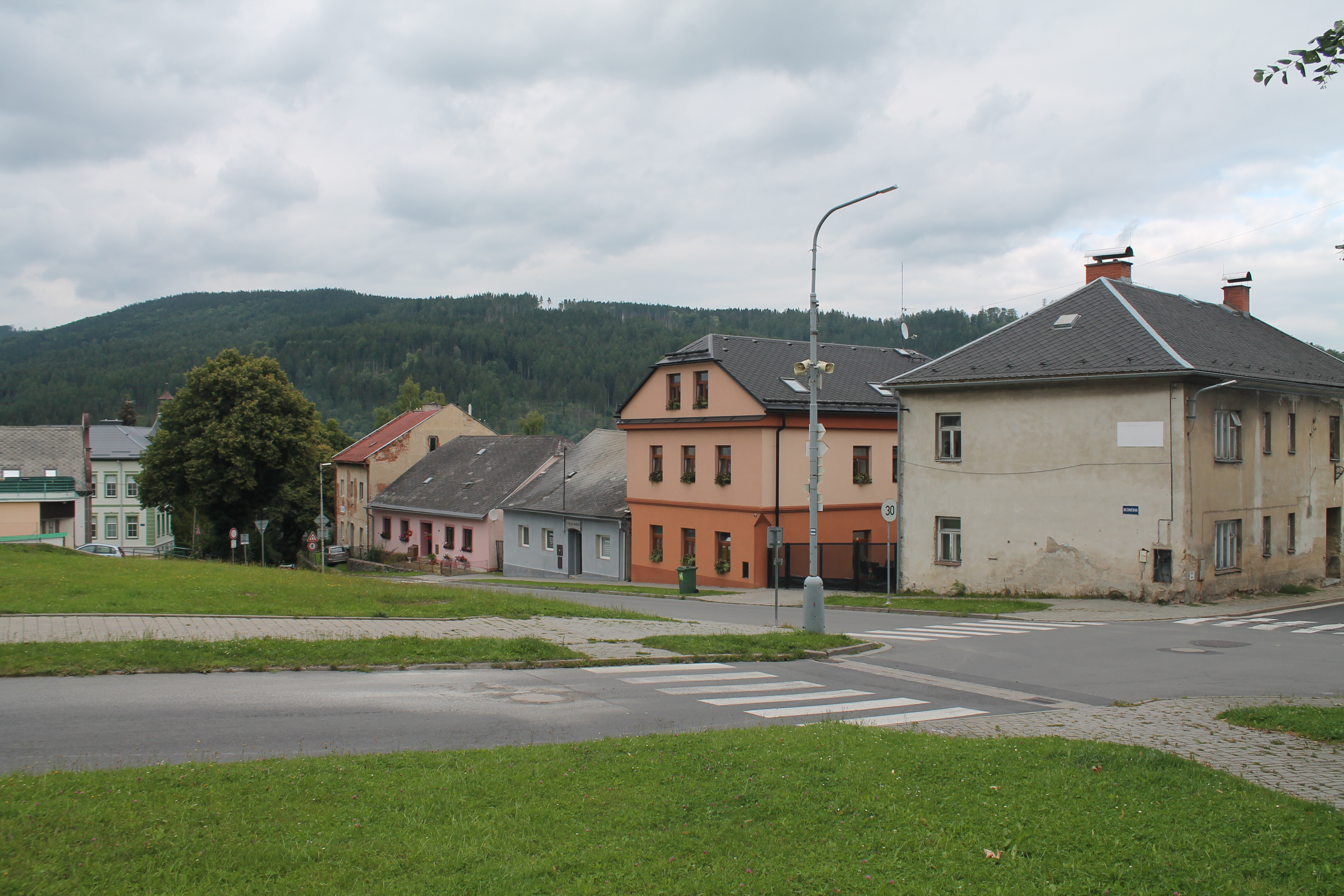
- The square Náměstí Sv. Michala

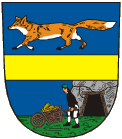
- Flag Coat of arms

- Location in the Czech Republic
- Coordinates: 50°7′15″N 17°23′0″E
- Country: Czech Republic
- Region: Moravian-Silesian
- District: Bruntál
- First mentioned: 1310

Government
  - Mayor: Jan Láňo

Area
  - Total: 68.91 km^{2} (26.61 sq mi)
- Elevation: 545 m (1,788 ft)

Population (2026-01-01)
  - Total: 4,627
  - Density: 67.15/km^{2} (173.9/sq mi)
- Time zone: UTC+1 (CET)
  - Summer (DST): UTC+2 (CEST)
- Postal code: 793 26
- Website: www.vrbnopp.cz

Vrbno pod Pradědem (Czech pronunciation: [ˈvr̩bno ˈpot praɟɛdɛm]; German: Würbenthal) is a town in Bruntál District in the Moravian-Silesian Region of the Czech Republic. It has about 4,600 inhabitants. The town is located on the Opava River in the Hrubý Jeseník mountain range.

Vrbno pod Pradědem was probably founded in the 13th century and became a mining town in 1611. The main landmark of the town is the Church of Saint Michael the Archangel.

== Administrative division ==
Vrbno pod Pradědem consists of five municipal parts (in brackets population according to the 2021 census):

- Vrbno pod Pradědem (3,680)
- Bílý Potok (11)
- Mnichov (703)
- Vidly (14)
- Železná (332)

== Geography ==
Vrbno pod Pradědem is located about 15 kilometres (9 mi) northwest of Bruntál and 58 km (36 mi) north of Olomouc. It lies mostly in the Hrubý Jeseník mountain range, only a small eastern part of the municipal territory extends into the Nízký Jeseník range. The slopes of Praděd, which is the highest mountain of the mountain range and is contained in the name of the town, are situated in the southwestern tip of the municipal territory. The highest point of Vrbno pod Pradědem is at 1,478 m (4,849 ft) above sea level. The Opava River and its tributary, Střední Opava, flow through the town.

== History ==
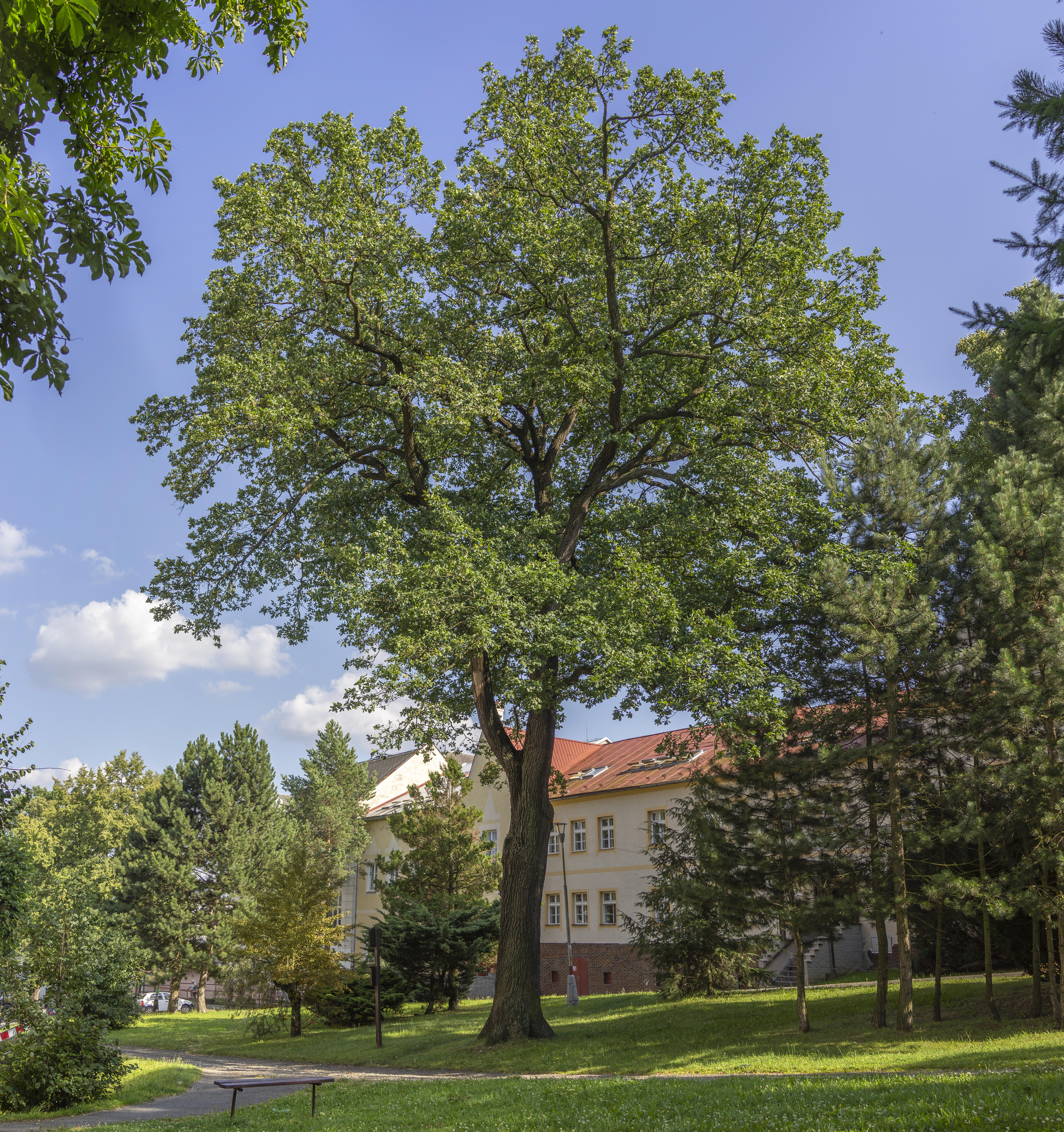
A park on the town square

The first settlement, which later became Vrbno pod Pradědem, was probably founded in the 13th century. The settlement grew thanks to gold and metal mining. It was part of the Bruntál estate. From 1473 or 1474, the estate was owned by the lords of Vrbno (today Wierzbna), after whom the settlement was named. In 1611, the settlement was promoted to a free mining town for its important location. Hynek of Vrbno had built the town square and houses for miners.

After the Bohemian Revolt, the estate was confiscated from the lords of Vrbno and sold to the Teutonic Order. The Teutonic Knights owned Vrbno until 1938. During the Thirty Years' War in 1641, the town became the site of a military camp of the army of Lennart Torstensson. In the second half of the 17th century, the town was hit by the infamous Northern Moravia witch trials.

According to the census of 1910 the town had 3,614 inhabitants, all of them were German-speaking. Most populous religious groups were Roman Catholics with 3,293 (91.1%), followed by Protestants with 307 (8.5%). Following World War I, since 1918, it was part of newly independent Czechoslovakia.

From 1938 to 1945, the town was occupied by Nazi Germany and administered as part of the Reichsgau Sudetenland. During World War II, the German administration operated the E791 forced labour subcamp of the Stalag VIII-B/344 prisoner-of-war camp in the town. The German-speaking population was expelled in 1945 in accordance to the Potsdam Agreement and Beneš decrees, and replaced by Czech settlers.

== Demographics ==
Historical population

Year	Pop.	±%
1869	5,188	—
1880	5,353	+3.2%
1890	5,619	+5.0%
1900	5,960	+6.1%
1910	6,479	+8.7%

Year	Pop.	±%
1921	5,876	−9.3%
1930	6,797	+15.7%
1950	3,725	−45.2%
1961	4,338	+16.5%
1970	5,242	+20.8%

Year	Pop.	±%
1980	6,536	+24.7%
1991	6,645	+1.7%
2001	6,244	−6.0%
2011	5,335	−14.6%
2021	4,740	−11.2%

Source: Censuses

== Economy ==
In Vrbno pod Pradědem, together with Prudnik, are headquarters of the Euroregion Praděd.

== Transport ==
Vrbno pod Pradědem is the terminus and start of a railway line from/to Milotice nad Opavou.

== Sights ==
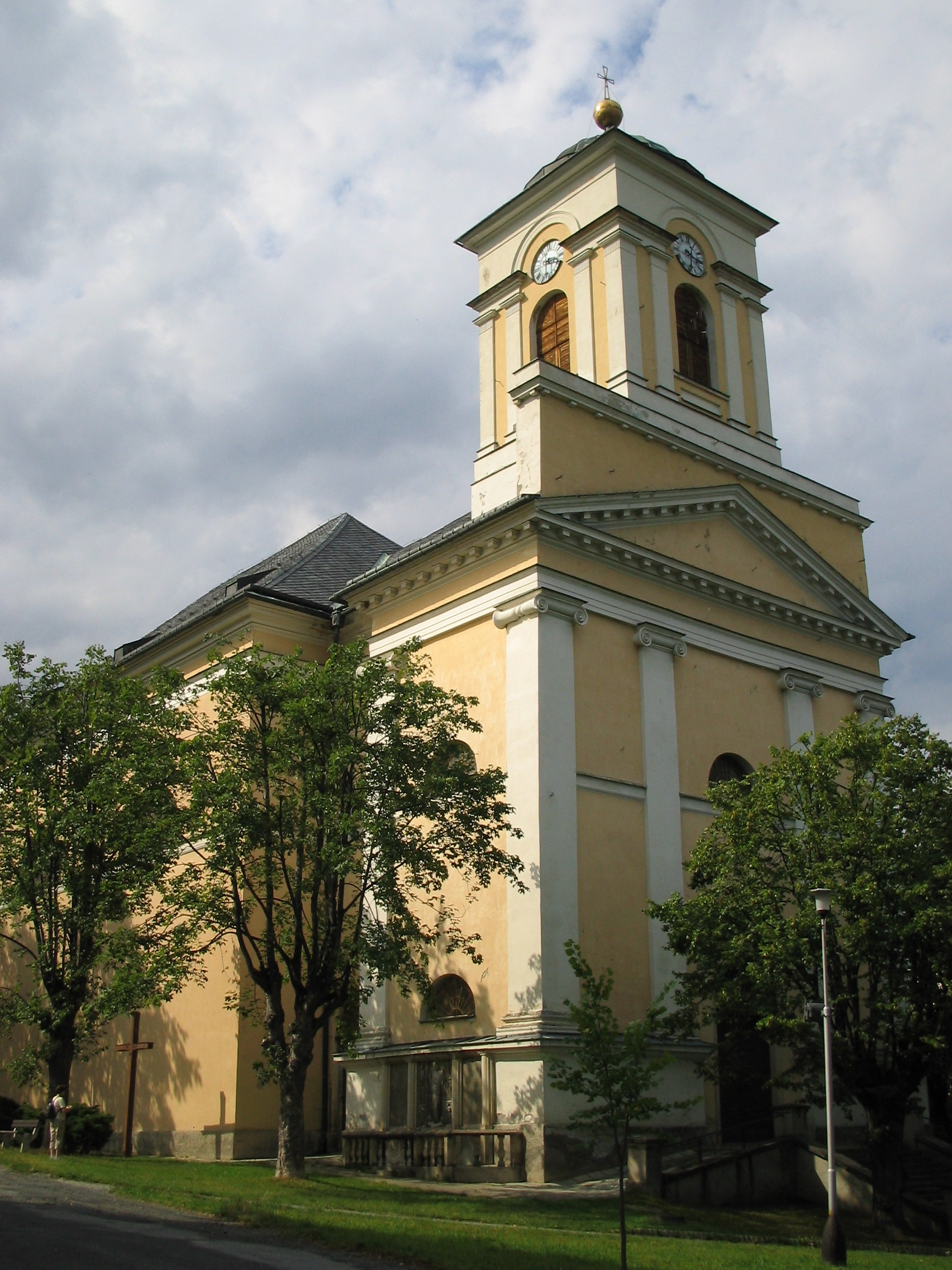
Church of Saint Michael the Archangel

The main landmark of the town square and the whole town is the Church of Saint Michael the Archangel. The first stone church was built here in 1635–1637, and after its capacity ceased to be sufficient, the current Empire structure was built in 1840–1843. In front of the church is a marble cross dating from 1825.

Grohmann Manor House is a former aristocratic residence in the Baroque and Empire styles with a core from the 17th century, gradually expanded in 18th and 19th centuries. The manor house is located in a landscape park surrounded by a wall from the 19th century. Today it is privately owned.

== Notable people ==
- Johann Karl Nestler (1783–1842), Austrian scientist

== Twin towns – sister cities ==
Vrbno pod Pradědem is twinned with:

- Głogówek, Poland

== Gallery ==
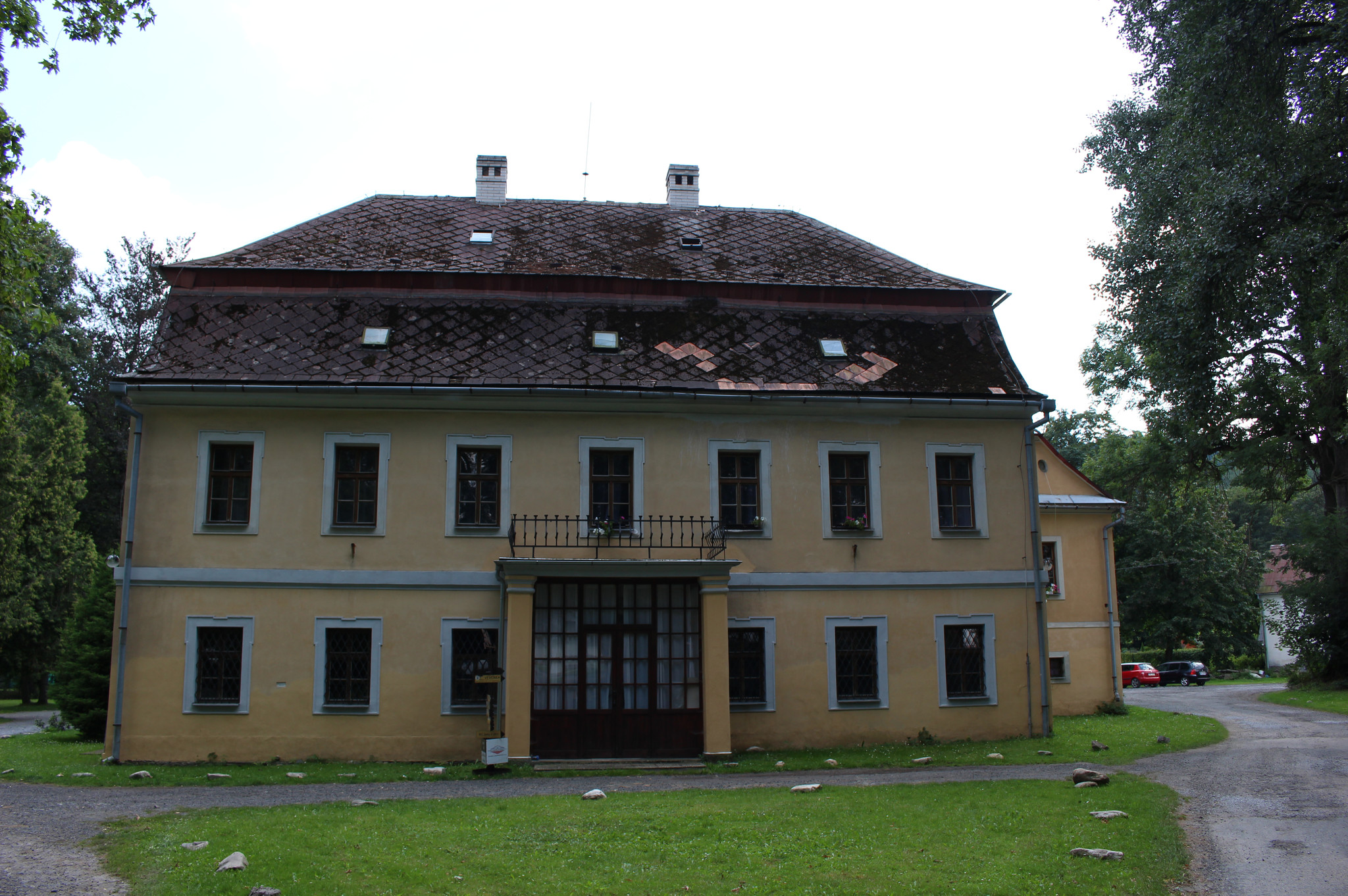
Grohmann Manor House

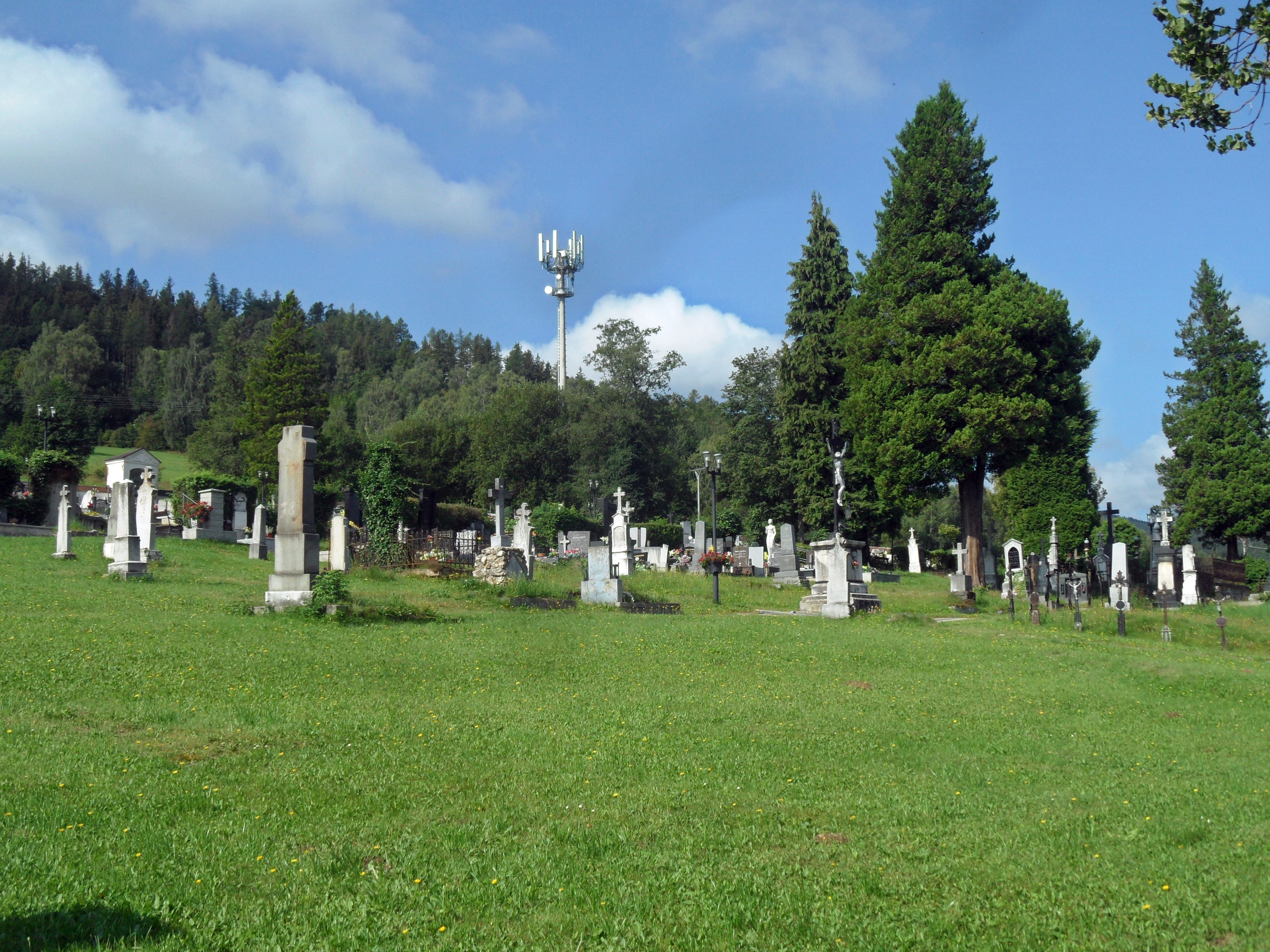
Overview of the cemetery

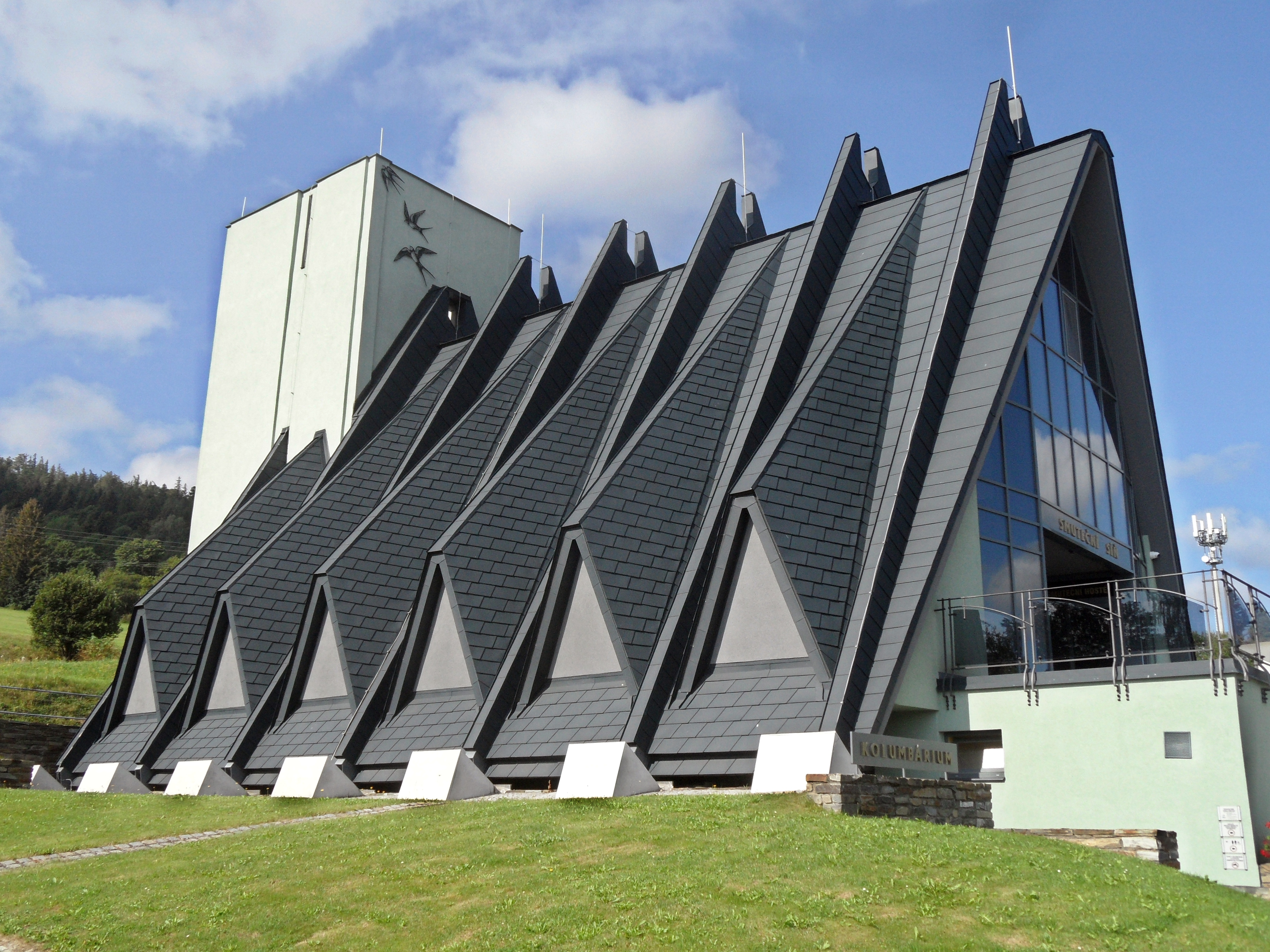
New ceremonial hall

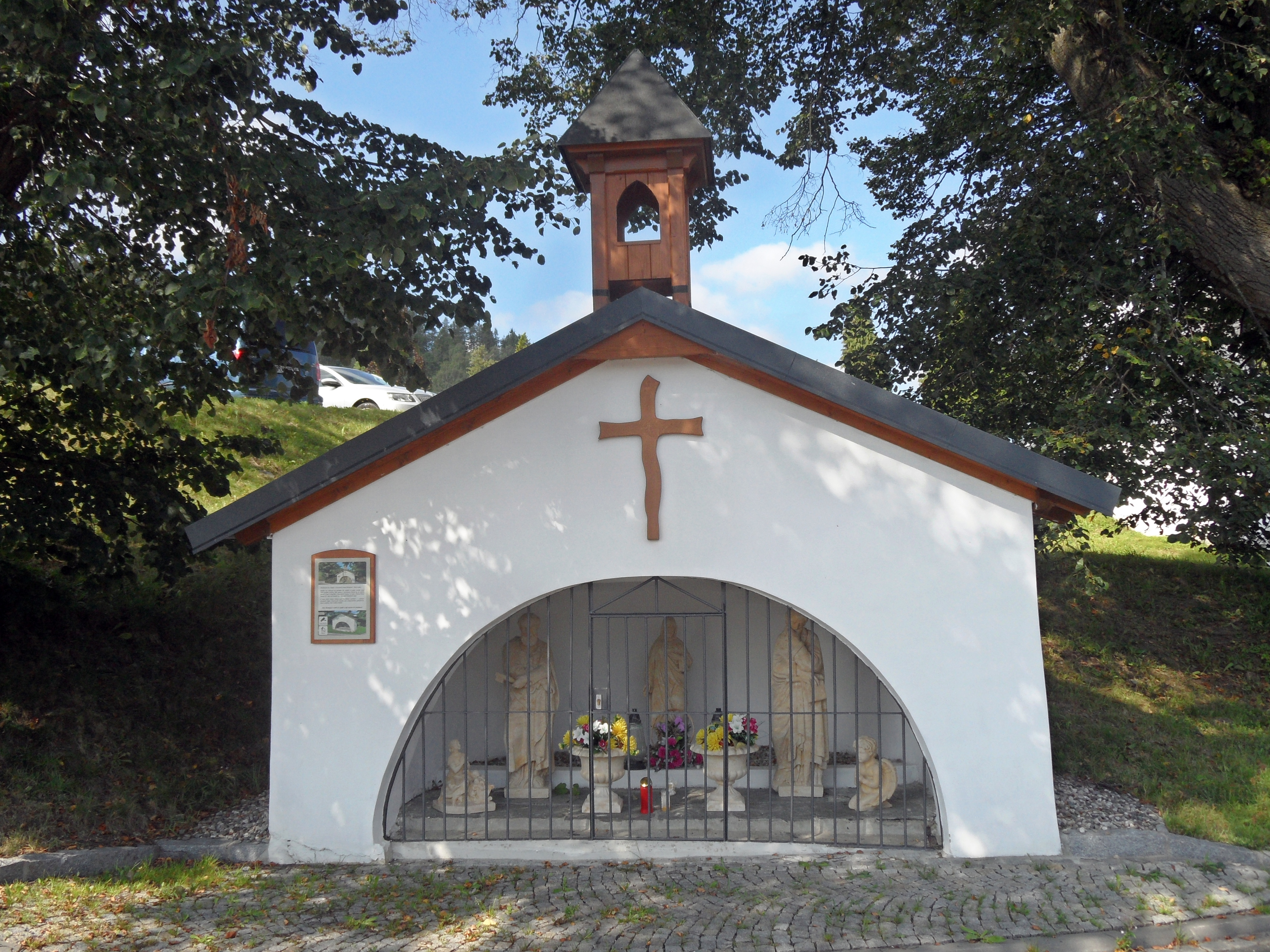
Chapel near cemetery
