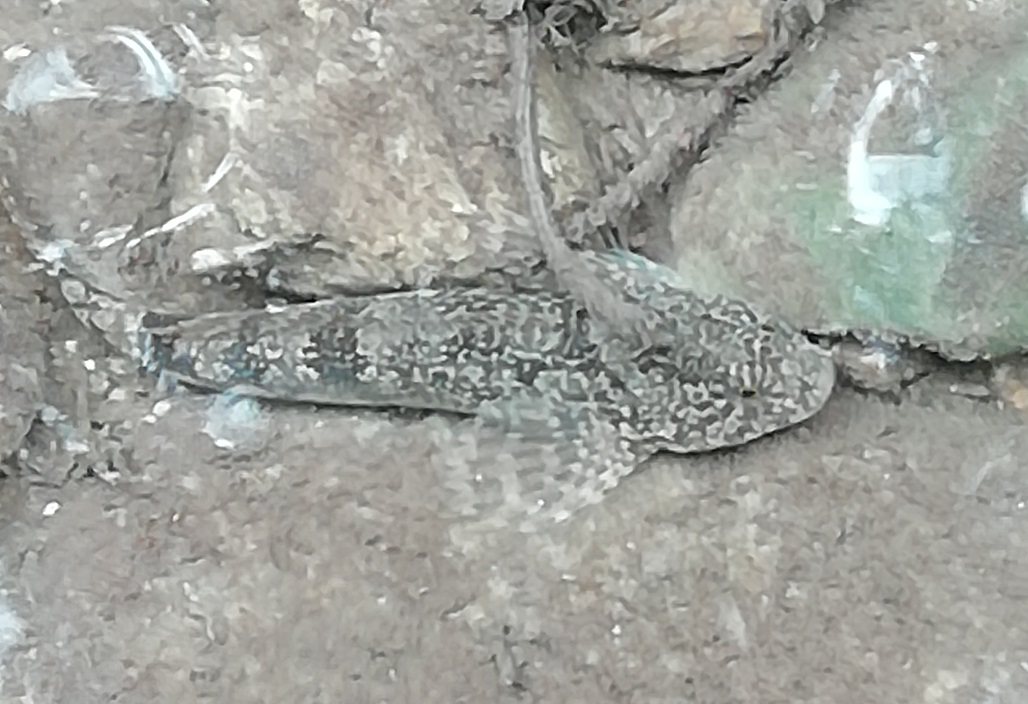

Conservation status
- Least Concern (IUCN 3.1)

Scientific classification
- Kingdom: Animalia
- Phylum: Chordata
- Class: Actinopterygii
- Division: Teleostei
- Order: Perciformes
- Suborder: Cottoidei
- Family: Cottidae
- Genus: Alpinocottus
- Species: A. poecilopus

Binomial name
- Alpinocottus poecilopus (Heckel, 1837)

Synonyms
- Cottus poecilopus Heckel, 1837; Cottus poecilopus macrostomus Jeitteles, 1862; Cottus poecilopus microstomus Jeitteles, 1862

= Alpine bullhead =

Species of fish

The alpine bullhead or Siberian bullhead (Alpinocottus poecilopus) is a species of freshwater fish in the family Cottidae of sculpins. It is found in China, the Czech Republic, Denmark, Finland, Germany, North Korea, Moldova, Norway, Poland, Romania, Russia, Slovakia, Sweden, and Ukraine. This fish is listed as being of "Least Concern" by the IUCN.

== Description ==
The alpine bullhead has a large broad head and tapering body, large fins and a rounded tail. It is light brown mottled with darker colour. The eyes are located near the top of the head. This fish resembles the European bullhead and can occur in same streams with it. It can be told from the European bullhead by the fact that the innermost ray of its pelvic fins is shorter than the outermost ray rather than being of similar length. The pelvic fins are spotted with darker colour and appear banded when bunched unlike the European bullhead's clear fins. When the fish rests on the bottom, the pectoral fins flare out resembling wings. The alpine bullhead is usually about 5 to 8 cm (2.0 to 3.1 in) long with a maximum of 12 cm (5 in).

== Distribution and habitat ==
The alpine bullhead is found in northern and central Europe in upland and coldwater streams and lakes in mountain regions.

== Biology ==
The alpine bullhead feeds on insects, crustaceans and small invertebrate prey that it finds on the bed of the stream. It is generally nocturnal but becomes diurnal in the Arctic during the winter. In spring, when the water temperature rises to 5 °C (41 °F), a male will prepare a nest site under a large stone and several females will lay their eggs in it. The male then guards the nest for the month or so until the eggs hatch.
