= Vysoká hora =

Mountain in the Czech Republic

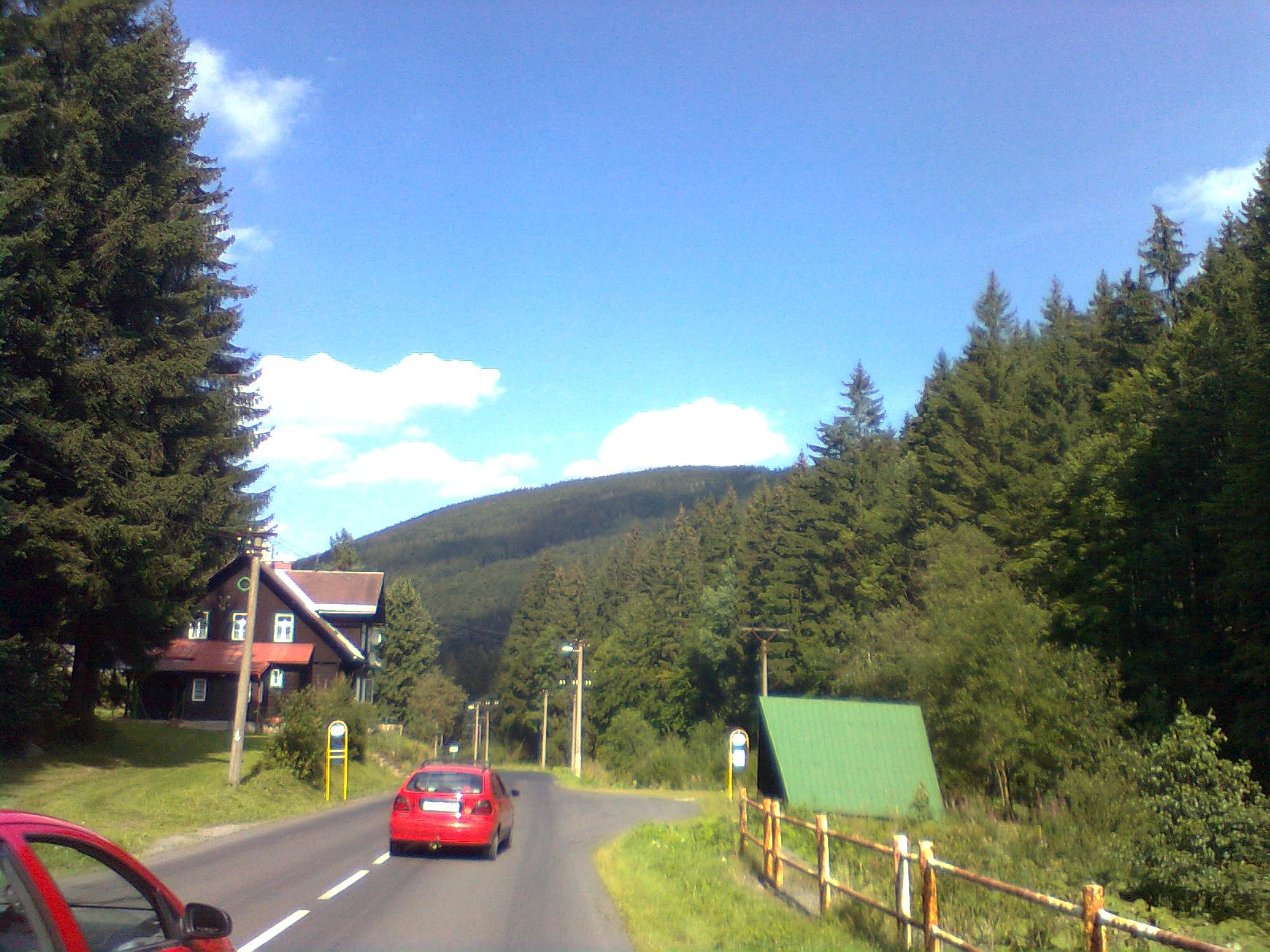
- View from the southwest

Highest point
- Elevation: 1,031 m (3,383 ft)
- Prominence: 178 m (584 ft)
- Isolation: 2.8 km (1.7 mi)
- Coordinates: 50°5′50″N 17°21′7″E

Geography
- Location within Czech Republic
- Location: Andělská Hora, Czech Republic
- Parent range: Hrubý Jeseník

Vysoká hora (German: Hohe Berg) is a mountain in the Hrubý Jeseník mountain range in the Czech Republic. It has an elevation of 1,031 m (3,383 ft) above sea level. It is located in the municipal territory of Andělská Hora.

== Characteristics ==
=== Location ===
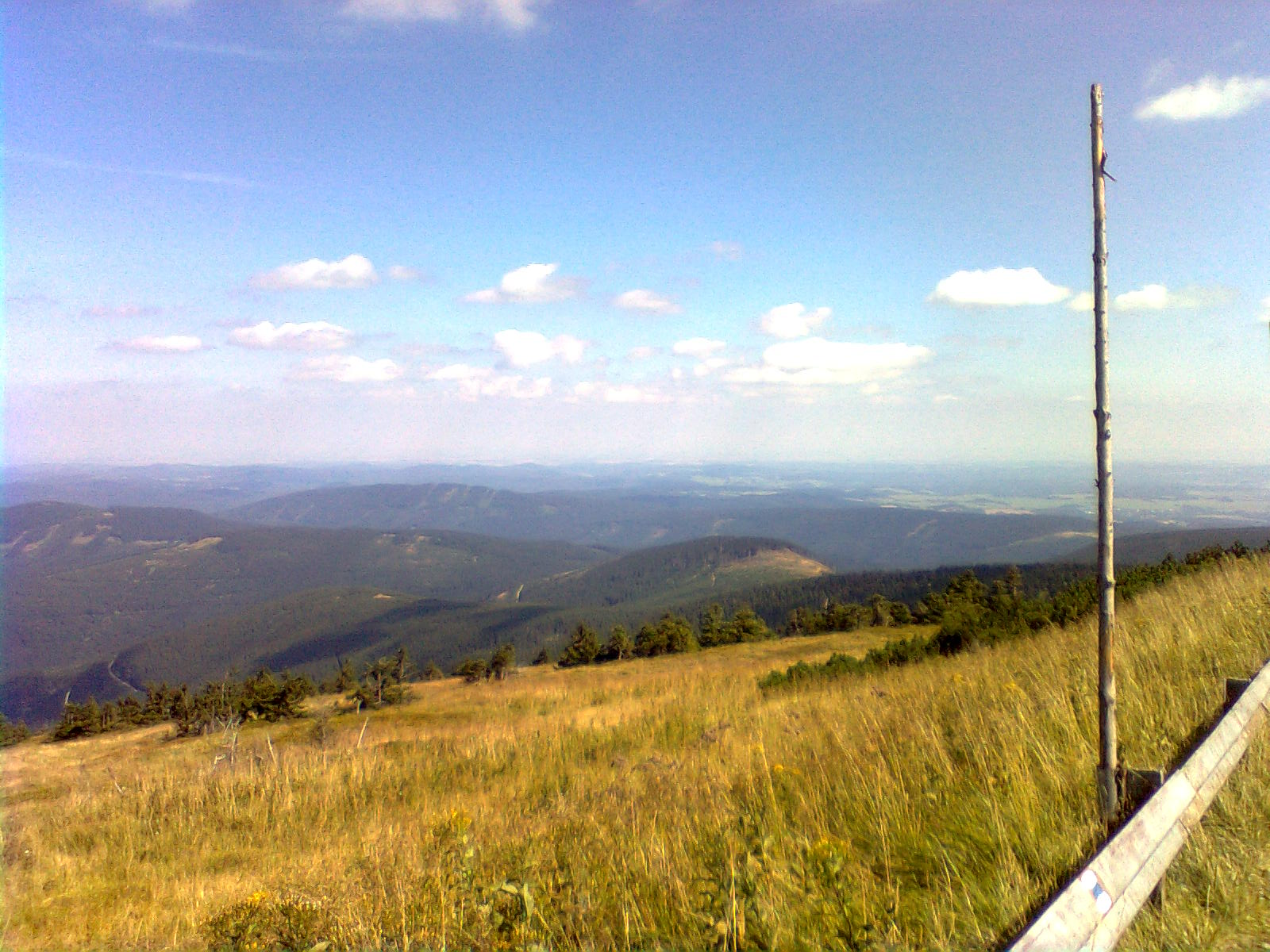
View from the road towards the summit of Praděd shows several mountains in the distance: Vysoká hora, Ovčí vrch, and Hřeben, with Žárový vrch and Lyra below, and even further below Prostřední vrch and Ostrý vrch

Vysoká hora is situated in the eastern region of the Hrubý Jeseník range, in the central area known as the Medvědí Mountains. It lies on the main southern, arc-shaped ridge as its highest point, extending from Zámecký vrch to Nad Rychtou in a chain of summits (Zámecký vrch → Brdo → Pod Vysokou → Vysoká hora → Ovčí vrch → Hřeben → Kopřívový vrch → Železný vrch → Nad Rychtou).

A characteristic feature of the mountain is its almost flat, arc-shaped summit ridge, about 900 meters long, stretching from the south to the northeast. The ridge appears as a slightly "jagged crest" when viewed from the west or east. Vysoká hora is a recognizable mountain, visible from the road from Zlaté Hory to Šternberk, where its slope can be seen. It is also visible from various summits, including Karliny kameny and Sokol, where it can be spotted in the line of sight towards Lyra. The summit is easily identifiable from the road around the summit of Praděd but hidden from the road circling Dlouhé stráně, obscured by Praděd.

The mountain is bordered by several geographical features:

- to the north, northwest, and west by the valley of the Bílá Opava stream;
- to the northeast by a subtle 904-meter pass leading to Pod Vysokou;
- to the east by the Zámecký potok valley;
- to the southeast by an 803-meter pass towards Kopřivník–S;
- to the south by the Zlatý potok valley and Malá hvězda pass towards Ovčí vrch.

Nearby summits include:

- Pod Vysokou and Brdo–Z to the northeast;
- Kopřivník and Anenský vrch to the southeast;
- Ovčí vrch, Skalnatý vrch, Rolandův kámen and Na vyhlídce to the southwest;
- Brantloch and Plošina to the northwest;
- Zámecká hora to the north.

=== Slopes ===
Vysoká hora has six main slopes:

- northern
- northeastern
- eastern
- southeastern
- southern
- western

All types of forestation can be found here: spruce forest, mixed forest, (Note: The forest stand of the entire Jeseníky Protected Landscape Area includes: European spruce 84%, European beech 10%, European larch 1.5%, sycamore maple 1.1%, birch 1%, common alder 0.8%, dwarf mountain pine 0.4%, grey alder 0.3%, (European silver fir, European ash, and linden) 0.2%, Scotch pine 0.1%, and others (Pinus mugo, oak, hornbeam, Norway maple, elm, rowan, green alder, aspen, poplar, and goat willow) 0.2%.) and deciduous forest, with spruce forest predominating. Along the northern, eastern, and western slopes, deciduous forests appear at lower elevations, and meadows can be found at the base, including Rýmařovská louka on the eastern slope. The forest cover on all slopes shows considerable variation in height, with clearings, numerous ridgeline breaks, and thinning areas. The western slope has larger clearings, where ski slopes for skiing and snow tubing were once laid out. Additionally, a 22 kV overhead power line runs near the western and northern slopes, close to II/445 road. At the base of the western slope, there is a group of rocks, though larger individual rock outcrops are absent. Close to the base of the northern slope, near the meadows, there is a significant boulder field.

The slopes are generally gentle and highly variable in their inclinations. The average slope gradient ranges from 5° on the northeast slope to 19° on the western slope, with the maximum gradient on a 50-meter stretch of the western slope not exceeding 30°. The mountain is crisscrossed with roads, such as Poštovská cesta and Rýmařovská cesta, as well as mostly unmarked paths and trails.

==== Abandoned mining sites ====
About 1.3 kilometers south of the summit, on the southern slope, at an elevation of around 855 meters, lies an inactive adit called Štola Hláska, where gold was once extracted from low-sulfur gold-quartz veins. Additionally, 1.1 kilometers southwest of the summit, on the western slope, at an elevation of around 745 meters, another abandoned adit called Důlní pole was used for copper extraction, with quartz veins containing chalcopyrite and malachite deposits.

=== Main summit ===
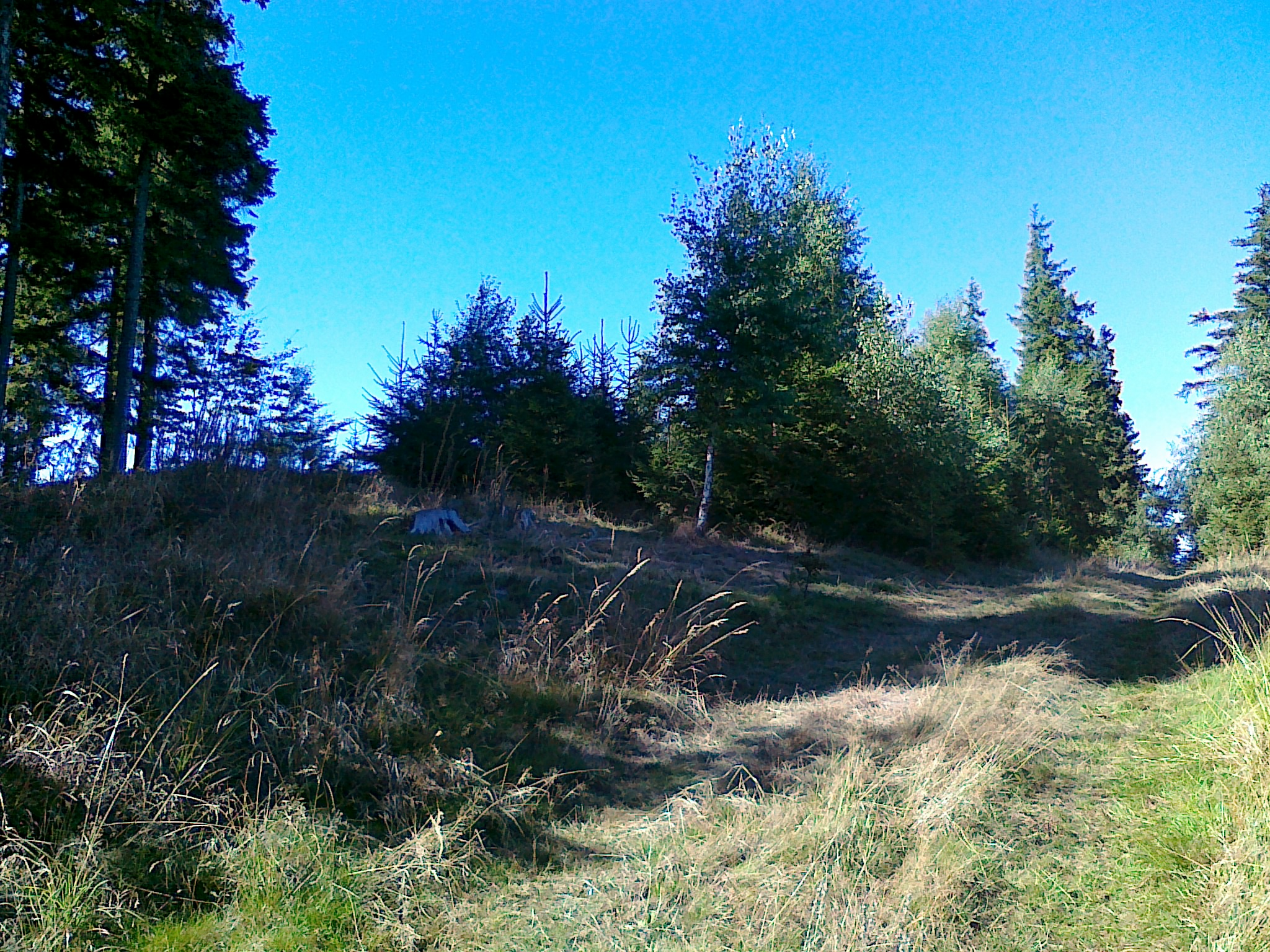
View of the summit and ridge road on the summit plateau of Vysoká hora

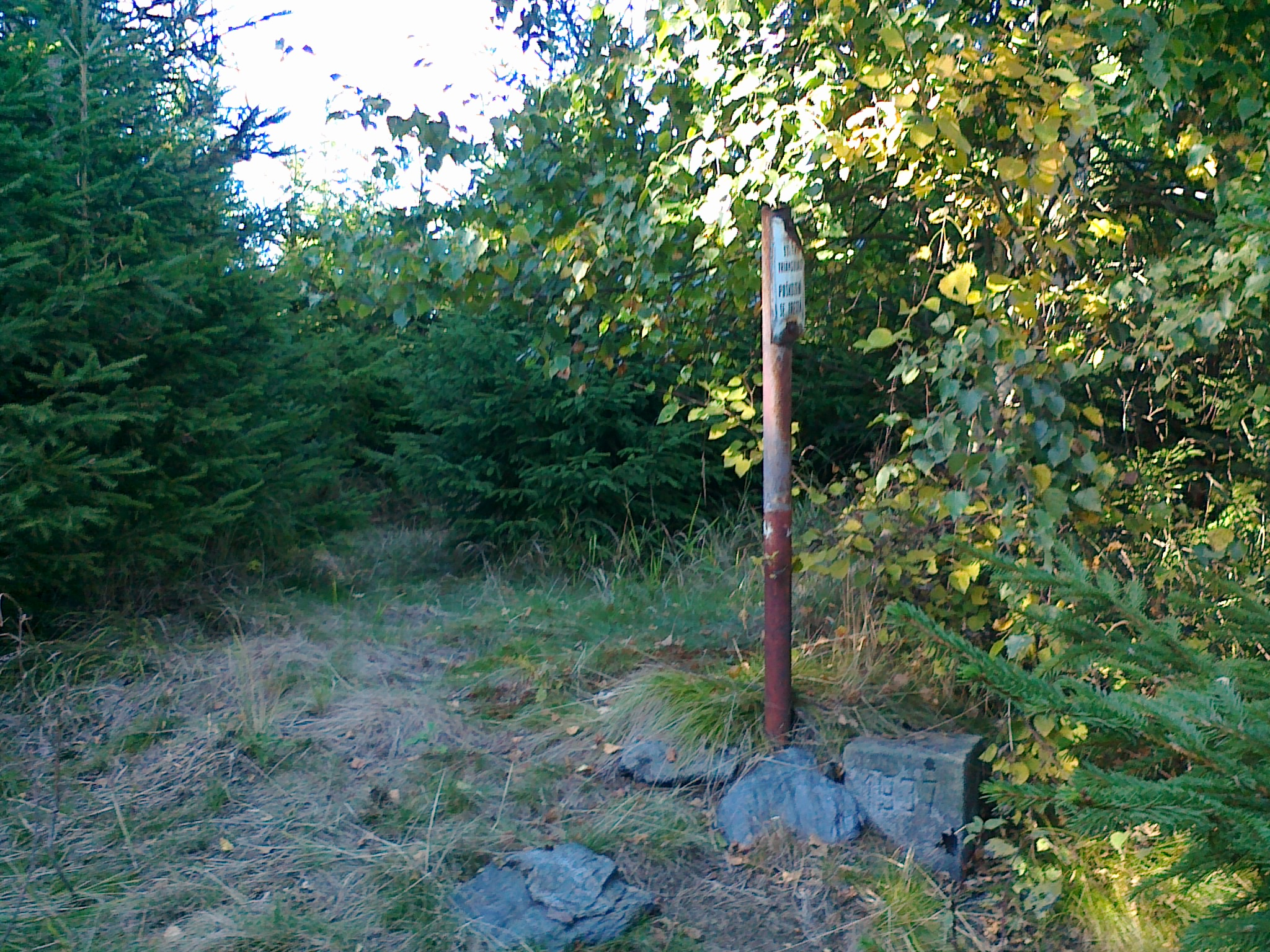
Triangulation station on the summit plateau of Vysoká hora

There is no marked tourist trail leading to the summit. However, a main ridge road passes through the summit plateau, extending from the plateau of Pod Vysokou and continuing to the Malá hvězda pass. The summit is located on a small clearing, close to the main ridge road, surrounded by spruce forest with a slight mix of deciduous trees, and covered with alpine grass and the European blueberry, which grows throughout the Hrubý Jeseník range. Due to the forest cover, it is not a viewpoint. Additionally, the forest service has fenced off a small rectangular area of about 250 m² on the summit plateau, visible in aerial photos. On the summit plateau, there is a triangulation station with the year of its establishment inscribed (1937), identified on geodetic maps with the number 21, at an altitude of 1,030.76 meters above sea level and geographic coordinates 50°05′50.51″N 17°21′07.63″E. Nearby, there is a steel post, about 50 cm high, with a heavily rusted steel plate at the top, bearing the inscription National triangulation network. Damage is punishable by law, located about 10 m northeast of the summit. According to the State Administration of Land Surveying and Cadastre, the highest point of the mountain is 1,031.3 meters above sea level, with geographic coordinates 50°05′50.4″N 17°21′07.2″E.

Access to the summit is via the nearly straight-running main ridge road from the green cycling trail and an unmarked intersection near the summit of Pod Vysokou (visible above the town of Vrbno pod Pradědem). From here, a distance of about 1.4 km leads to the summit plateau, with the summit located to the right of the road. Alternatively, one can reach the summit from the Malá hvězda pass and tourist intersection.

=== Secondary summit ===
Vysoká hora has a secondary summit. About 1.2 km east of the main summit lies the secondary peak, known as Vysoká hora–V, with an elevation of 817 meters above sea level and geographic coordinates 50°05′50.9″N 17°22′06.5″E. It is separated from the main summit by a low pass at 816 meters above sea level. The secondary summit is situated in dense mixed forest. Due to the forest cover, it is not a viewpoint and does not feature a triangulation station.

=== Geology ===
Geologically, part of the Vysoká hora mountain massif belongs to the unit known as the Vrbno layers, and another part to the Andělská Hora formation. It is composed of metamorphic rocks, mainly: phyllites (muscovites, biotites, chlorites), greenschists, metamorphic schists (graphites), quartzites, gneisses, amphibolites, stromatolites, and blasto-mylonites; igneous rocks, mainly diabases (meta-dolerites) and meta-granitoids; and sedimentary rocks, primarily conglomerates. The shape of the mountain massif and the presence of diabases suggest its volcanic origin.

=== Waters ===
Vysoká hora summit

Climate chart (precipitation, max. and min. temperature)
J	F	M	A	M	J	J	A	S	O	N	D
37 −3 −8	36 −3 −7	52 3 −4	65 9 0	113 14 5	113 16 8	123 19 10	98 19 10	70 14 6	42 10 2	49 3 −2	39 −2 −6
- █ Average max. and min. temperatures in °C
- █ Precipitation totals in mm
- Source: Climate of Vysoká hora [Ludvíkov]. meteoblue.com
Imperial conversion
J	F	M	A	M	J	J	A	S	O	N	D
1.5 27 18	1.4 27 19	2 37 25	2.6 48 32	4.4 57 41	4.4 61 46	4.8 66 50	3.9 66 50	2.8 57 43	1.7 50 36	1.9 37 28	1.5 28 21
- █ Average max. and min. temperatures in °F
- █ Precipitation totals in inches

The summit and slopes of Vysoká hora lie to the northeast of the European watershed boundary, meaning they belong to the Baltic Sea drainage basin. The waters from this part of the Hrubý Jeseník mountains flow into rivers like the Oder, fed by mountain streams such as the nearby Bílá Opava, Zlatý potok, and Zámecký potok. The Zámecký potok stream originates from the eastern slope of Vysoká hora. Due to the relatively gentle slope gradients, there are no waterfalls or cascades on the mountain. A marshy area is located on the southeastern slope near an unnamed stream, a tributary of Zlatý potok. Numerous springs also occur on the slopes.

Springs at the slopes of Vysoká hora
Number	Spring name	Distance from summit (meters)	Elevation (meters above sea level)	Geographic coordinates
1	Studánka Pod Hláskou (13078)	1,430 m to the south	836	50°05′04″N 17°21′07″E
2	Studánka (12771)	730 m to the east	859	50°05′53″N 17°21′44″E
3	Studánka (13076)	1,750 m to the southeast	762	50°05′05″N 17°22′01″E
4	Studánka (13077)	850 m to the southeast	907	50°05′25″N 17°21′24″E

== Nature preservation ==
The entire Vysoká hora mountain lies within the Jeseníky Protected Landscape Area, which was established to protect rock formations, soil structures, plant life, and rare animal species. No nature reserves or natural monuments have been designated on its slopes.

At the foot of the mountain, partially along the II/445 road and the western slope, runs a 26.5 km educational trail known as the Naučná stezka Muzeum Wide Web, which stretches from Malá Morávka to Karlovice and features 17 observation points along the route.

== Tourism ==
=== Hiking trails ===
The Czech Tourist Club has marked three hiking routes on Vysoká hora:

Vrbno pod Pradědem – Pod Vysokou – Vysoká hora – Kopřívník – St. Anne's Church – Anenský vrch – Andělská Hora – Světlá Hora

Hvězda pass – Hřeben – Ovčí vrch – Malá hvězda pass – Vysoká hora – Vrbno pod Pradědem

Hvězda pass – Hřeben – Ovčí vrch – Malá hvězda pass – Kopřívník – Anenský vrch – Uhliřský Potok Valley – Karlovice

=== Cycling routes ===
Three cycling routes run along the slopes or base of the mountain:

Route 553: Drakov – Vrbno pod Pradědem – Ludvíkov – Karlova Studánka – Hvězda pass – Malá Morávka – Dolní Moravice – Harrachovský kopec – Rýmařov

Vrbno pod Pradědem – Pod Vysokou – Vysoká hora – Kopřívník – Anenský vrch – Andělská Hora – Suchá Rudná

Holčovice – Jelení – Karlovice – Kamenný vrch – Zámecký Potok Valley – Vysoká hora – Pod Vysokou – Malá hvězda pass – Ovčí vrch – Dřevina – Hřeben – Kopřívový vrch – Pastvina – Morgenland Natural Monument – Nová Rudná

Additionally, road 445, passing at the base of the mountain, is used to ascend the Hvězda pass:

Vrbno pod Pradědem – Hvězda pass (length: 8.9 km, elevation difference: 308 m, average incline: 3.5%).

=== Skiing routes ===
During snowy periods, marked cross-country skiing routes follow hiking and some other paths. At the foot of the mountain in Ludvíkov, the Ski Ludvíkov ski resort is located near road 445, offering a slope for snow tubing. On the western slope of Vysoká hora, the following ski and snow tubing routes are available:

Ski and snow tubing routes with lifts on Vysoká hora
Number	Trail and marking	Length of the trail (m)	Height difference (m)	Type of lift	Length of lift (m)
2		200	60	T-bar lift	200
1		200	35	snowtubing	100
