= Anenský vrch =

Mountain in the Czech Republic

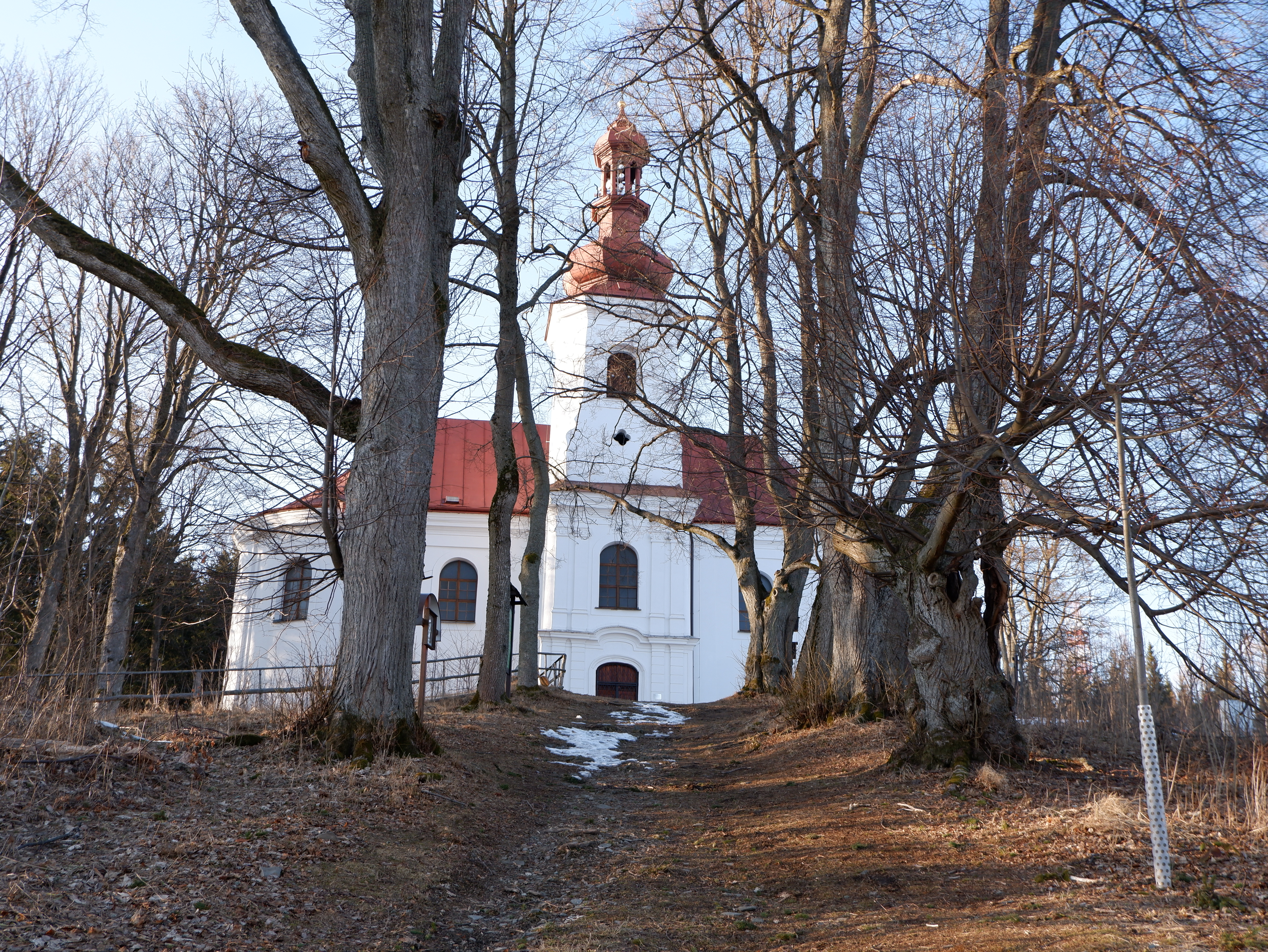
- St. Anne's Church on the slope of Anenský vrch

Highest point
- Elevation: 861 m (2,825 ft)
- Prominence: 59 m (194 ft)
- Coordinates: 50°4′26″N 17°22′41″E

Geography
- Location within Czech Republic
- Location: Andělská Hora, Czech Republic
- Parent range: Hrubý Jeseník

Anenský vrch (German: Anna Berg) is a mountain in the Hrubý Jeseník mountain range in the Czech Republic. It has an elevation of 861 m (2,825 ft) above sea level. It is located in the municipal territory of Andělská Hora.

== Characteristics ==
=== Location ===
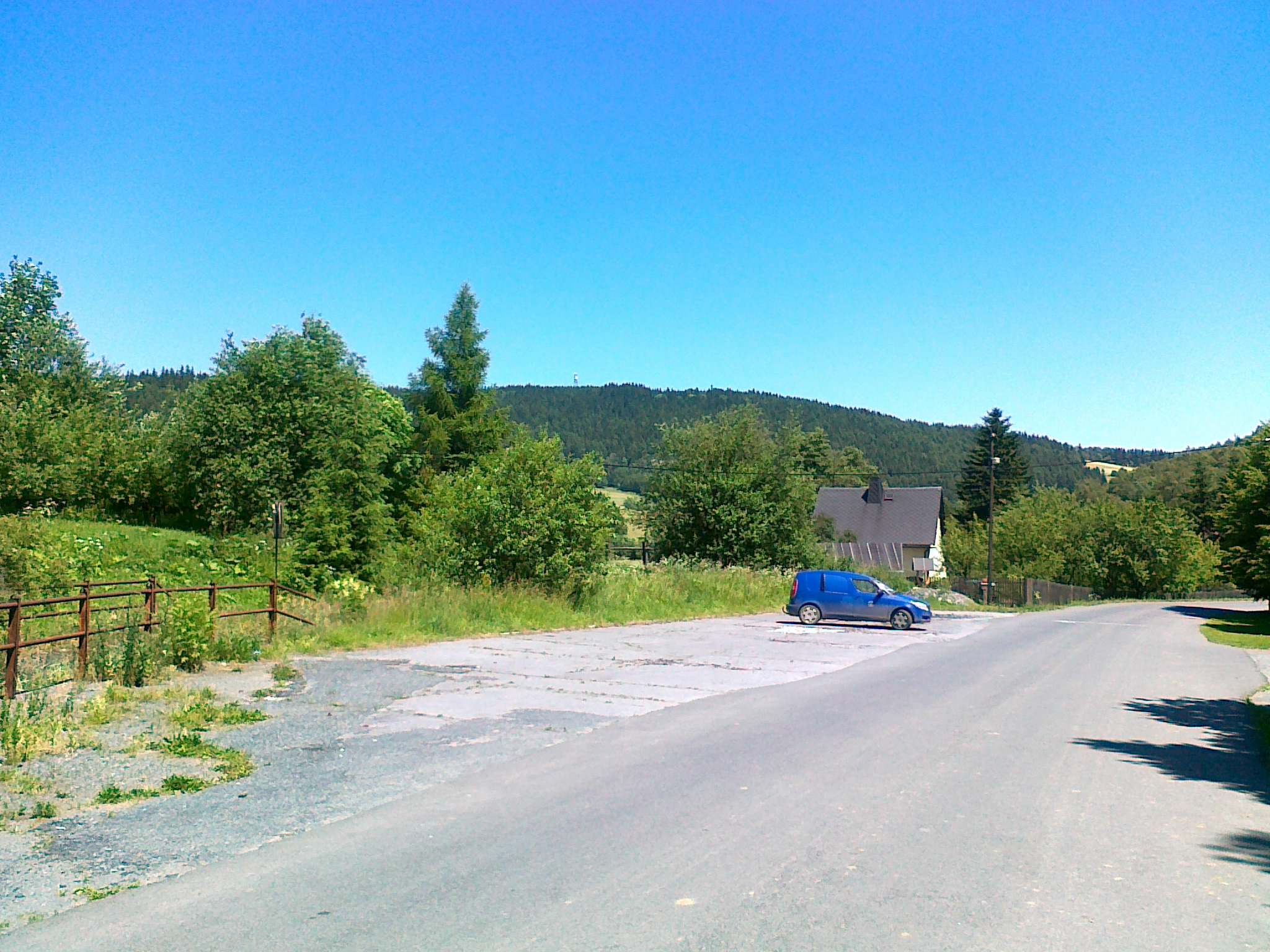
View from Suchá Rudná towards Anenský vrch

Anenský vrch is situated in the eastern microregion of the Hrubý Jeseník mountain range, known as the Medvědí Mountains. It lies on a side branch of the southern, arc-shaped ridge of the mountain Vysoká hora, stretching from Zámecký vrch to Nad Rychtou mountains. The mountain has a domed shape at the top and is located on the edge of the Orlík Massif, bordering the Nízký Jeseník range. It is easily recognizable as it has the highest elevation in this part of the range. There is a small steel lattice base transceiver station installed near its summit.

The mountain is recognizable from the road no. 452 running at its eastern base between Holčovice and Bílčice. It is not easily visible from the road surrounding the summit of Praděd (visible to the right below the summit of Ostrý vrch). From the road encircling the summit of Dlouhé stráně, it is not visible due to being obscured by Divoký kámen. From the lookout tower on Biskupia Kopa, the summit is barely visible and can be mistaken for the mountain Šindelná, which lies along the same line of sight.

The mountain is bordered by:

- to the southwest by the valley of the Stará voda stream;
- to the west by the valley of the Zlatý potok stream;
- to the northwest by a pass at 829 meters above sea level towards the summit Kopřivník–JZ;
- to the northeast by the valley of the Uhlířský potok stream;
- to the east by a pass at 741 meters above sea level towards an unnamed peak at 750 meters above sea level;
- to the southeast by part of the valley of the Světlohorský potok stream;
- to the south by a pass at 728 meters above sea level towards the summit Halda.

Surrounding peaks include:

- to the north, Kopřivník;
- to the northeast, Šindelná, Šindelná–J, Šindelná–JV, Hrbek–SZ, Hrbek, V Koleně, and Kamenná Hůrka (the latter two in the Nízký Jeseník range);
- to the east, an unnamed peak at 750 meters above sea level;
- to the southeast, Zlatý kopec, and unnamed peaks at 765, 710, 681, 680, 688, and 705 meters above sea level (all in the Nízký Jeseník range);
- to the south, Halda;
- to the southwest, unnamed peaks at 686 and 716 meters above sea level, and Dřevina;
- to the west, Ovčí vrch;
- to the northwest, Hláska, Kopřivník–JZ, and Kopřivník–SZ.

=== Slopes ===
Anenský vrch features eight main slopes:

- northeastern
- eastern
- southeastern
- southern
- southwestern
- western
- northwestern
- northern

Approximately 50% of the slopes are forested, while the remaining areas are covered with meadows and arable fields. All types of forestation can be found here: spruce forest, mixed forest, (Note: The forest stand of the entire Jeseníky Protected Landscape Area includes: European spruce 84%, European beech 10%, European larch 1.5%, sycamore maple 1.1%, birch 1%, common alder 0.8%, dwarf mountain pine 0.4%, grey alder 0.3%, (European silver fir, European ash, and linden) 0.2%, Scotch pine 0.1%, and others (Pinus mugo, oak, hornbeam, Norway maple, elm, rowan, green alder, aspen, poplar, and goat willow) 0.2%.) and deciduous forest, with mixed forest predominating. All slopes except the spruce forest display areas of mixed forest and patches of deciduous forest at lower elevations. Meadows and arable fields are found on the northeastern, eastern, southeastern, southern, and southwestern slopes. From the open areas, there are views of the surrounding landscape and nearby peaks. Nearly all slopes show significant variability in forest coverage, featuring large clearings and sparse areas. On the meadows and arable fields, almost linear tree zones separate different plots due to land and building registration. There are no rock groups or large rock formations on the slopes, but the lower eastern slope and the base of the southern slope contain boulder fields. A 22 kV overhead power line runs at the foot of the northeastern, eastern, and southeastern slopes.

On the eastern slope, near the summit, approximately 200 m northeast of the peak, there is a take-off point for hang gliders and paragliders named PG startoviště Anenský vrch. Additionally, on the southeastern slope, about 1.2 km southeast of the summit, there is a landing field named PG přistávací plocha Anenský vrch. The southeastern slope also contains areas for downhill skiing, with three T-bar lifts constructed for access. Approximately 200 m south of the summit (on the southern slope), the Baroque pilgrimage St. Anne's Church was built in 1696, accessible via an avenue lined with maples and linden trees, featuring 15 Stations of the Cross. A restaurant with an outdoor terrace is located near this church.

The slopes have gentle and relatively uniform inclines, with an average gradient ranging from 4° (eastern slope) to 13° (western and northwestern slopes). The overall average slope gradient is about 8°. The maximum average gradient on the southwestern slope near the Zlatý potok stream, at around 710 m above sea level over a 50-meter stretch, does not exceed 35°. The slopes are crisscrossed with roads, generally unmarked paths, and tracks.

==== Avenue with the Stations of the Cross ====
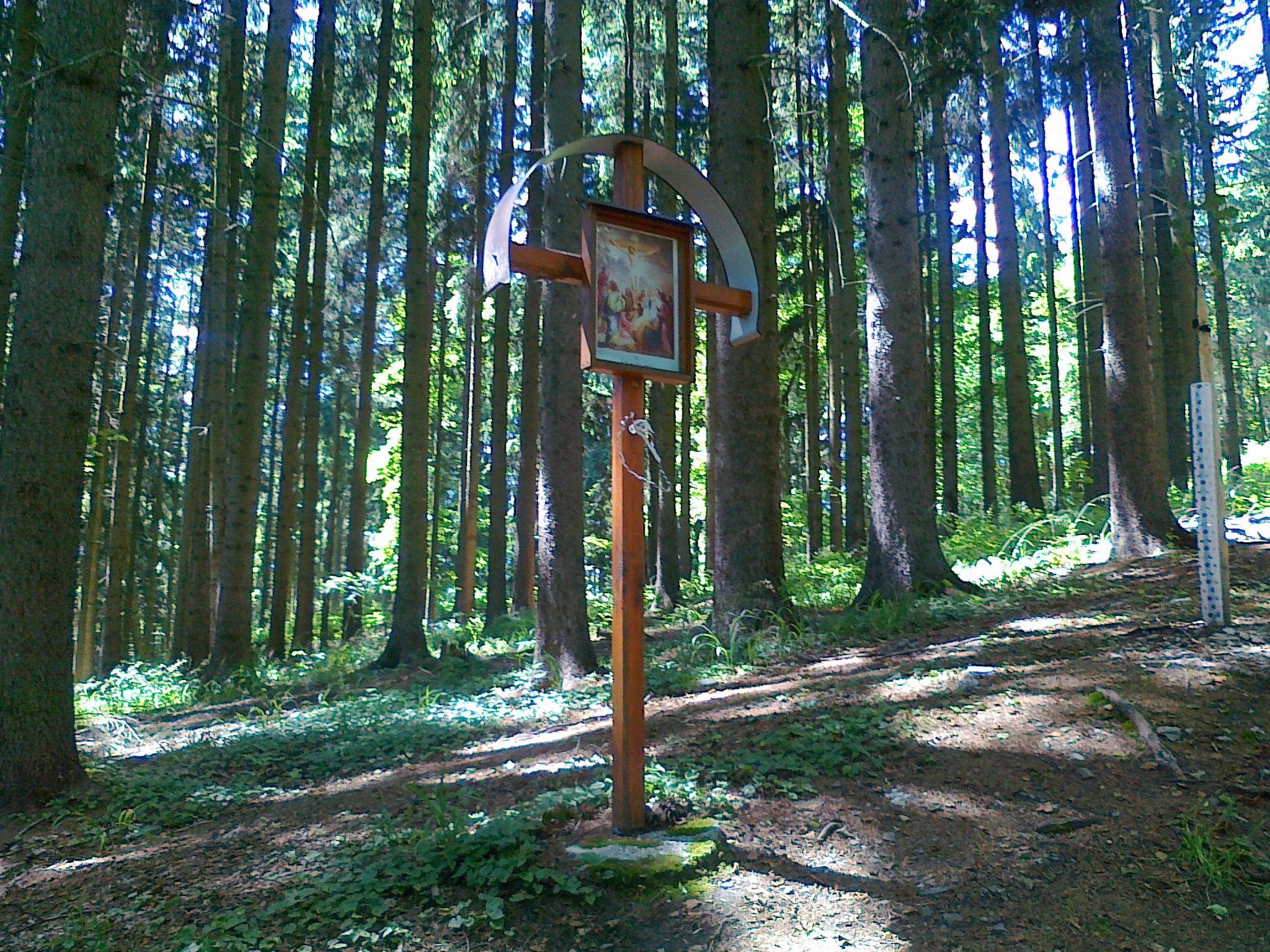
12th station of the Stations of the Cross on the slope of Anenský vrch

On the upper southeastern slope, along the nearly straight avenue named Alej k Anenskému vrchu, along which there are many trees considered commemorative, the Stations of the Cross were marked in 2005. The Stations are situated along the red tourist trail, between the Alej k Anenskému vrchu intersection (elevation of 775 m) and the Anenský vrch intersection near the St. Anne's Church. The route with 15 stations (13 on the left side and 2 on the right) is about 370 m long with a vertical rise of about 60 m, and an average distance between stations of around 30 m. Each station has a wooden cross fixed with a concrete base, protected by a metal roof. Inside each cross is a framed passion painting by Czech sculptor František Nedomlel, depicting scenes from Jesus Christ's journey on the Via Dolorosa.

=== Main summit ===
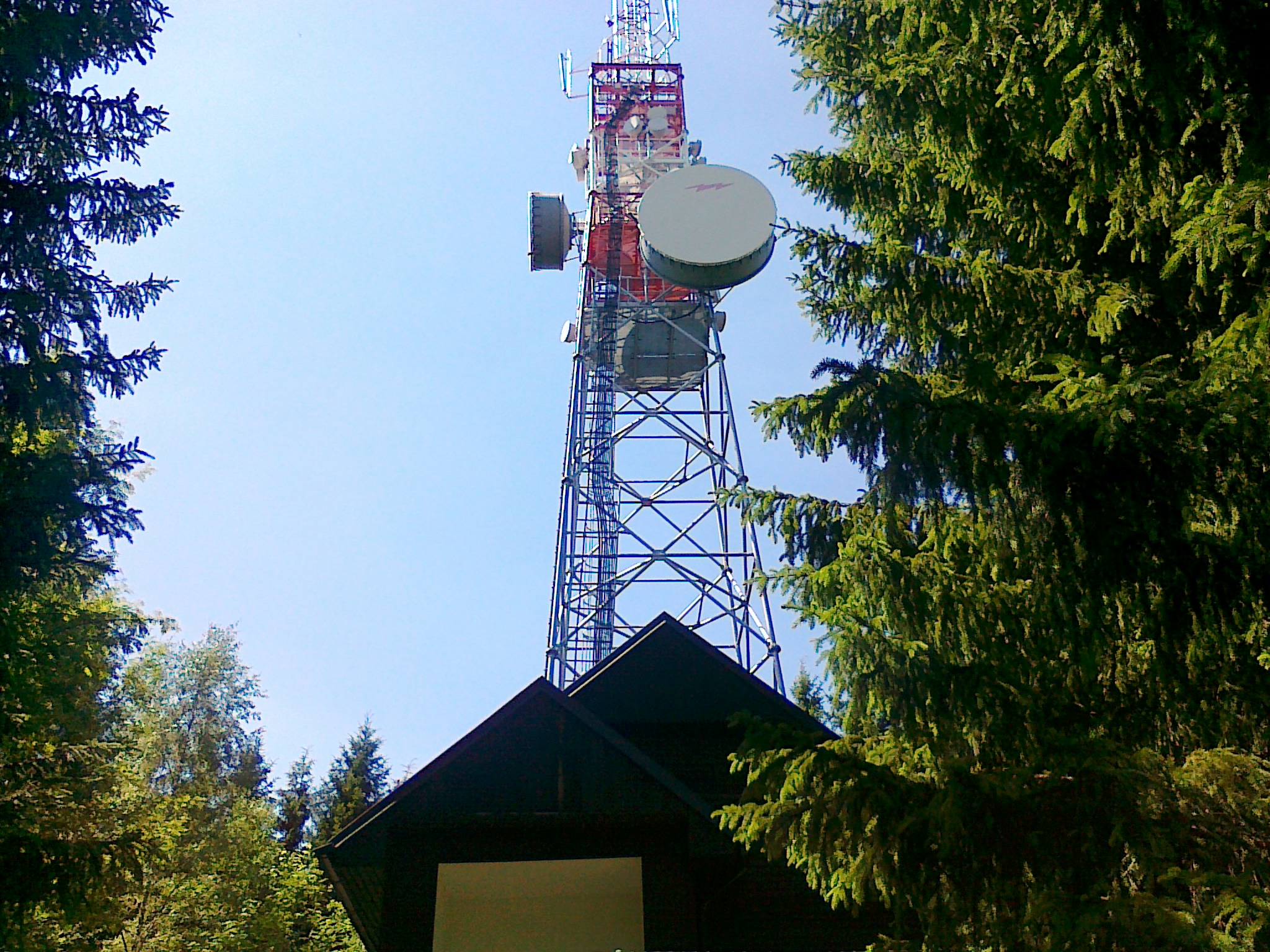
Tower on the summit area of Anenský vrch

Anenský vrch has a main summit that is not accessible by any marked tourist trail. However, there is a main path leading to the summit from the yellow tourist trail. The summit is surrounded by dense spruce forest, which obstructs views, making it not a viewpoint. At the summit, there is a previously mentioned base transceiver station and a building housing the station's installations. The primary triangulation station is marked on maps with number 34, at an elevation of 860.69 m above sea level, and coordinates 50°04′25.70″N 17°22′41.17″E, located about 5 m southeast of the summit. The State Administration of Land Surveying and Cadastre lists the highest point of the mountain at 860.7 m above sea level with coordinates 50°04′25.8″N 17°22′40.9″E.

The summit can be reached via a short, unmarked path about 180 m long from the yellow tourist trail, approximately 120 m from the Anenský vrch trail intersection.

=== Secondary summit ===
Anenský vrch is a mountain with a double summit. About 770 m northwest of the main summit is the secondary summit Anenský vrch–SZ, with an elevation of 844 m above sea level and coordinates 50°04′37.5″N 17°22′06.7″E, separated from the main summit by a low pass at an elevation of 836 m above sea level. The secondary summit is also surrounded by spruce forest and does not offer viewpoints or have a triangulation station.

=== Geology ===
Geologically, the Anenský vrch massif consists of slightly metamorphosed sedimentary rocks of the Silesian-Moravian zone (Andělská Hora formation), mainly composed of shales, graywackes, and siltstones, with minor fine-grained sandstones.

=== Waters ===
The summit and slopes of Anenský vrch lie east of the European watershed, falling within the Baltic Sea watershed. This includes waters from the Oder river basin, which extends from the mountain streams in this part of the Hrubý Jeseník mountains, such as the Stará voda, Zlatý potok, Uhlířský potok and Světlohorský potok. The southeastern slope is the source of the Světlohorský potok. The southwestern slope gives rise to a short unnamed stream, a tributary of Stará voda. On the southern slope, about 950 m southeast of the summit, at an elevation of approximately 720 m above sea level, there is a spring named Studánka Pod Lipami, near an unmarked road leading from the village of Andělská Hora. Additionally, at the base of the southwestern slope, there is a fish pond about 150 m long, and at the base of the western slope, another pond about 20 m long on the Zlatý potok stream. Due to the relatively gentle slopes, there are no waterfalls or cascades on the mountain.

=== Nature protection ===
Most of the mountain, to the west of road number 452 (excluding the lower parts of the northeastern, eastern, and southeastern slopes), is part of the Jeseníky Protected Landscape Area. This area was established to protect geological formations, soil, plants, and rare animal species. There are no nature reserves or designated natural monuments on the slopes of the mountain.

To preserve the unique ecosystem, an educational trail called NS Anenský vrch was established in 2010, starting from the village of Andělská Hora. The trail is approximately 2.9 km long and includes six observation points along the route Andělská Hora – Anenský vrch mountain – Anenský vrch.

== Tourism ==
=== Hiking and biking trails ===
The Czech Tourist Club has established two hiking trails in the vicinity of Anenský vrch:

Vrbno pod Pradědem – Pod Vysokou – Vysoká hora – Kopřívník – St. Anne's Church – Anenský vrch – Andělská Hora – Světlá Hora

Hvězda pass – Hřeben – Ovčí vrch – Malá hvězda pass – Kopřívník – Anenský vrch – St. Anne's Church – Uhliřský Potok valley – Freudenstein Castle ruins – Kamenný vrch – Karlovice

Additionally, there are two cycling routes through the mountain:

Suchá Rudná – Andělská Hora – Anenský vrch – Kopřivník – Vrbno pod Pradědem

Bruntál – Rudná pod Pradědem – Suchá Rudná – Hvězda pass – Karlova Studánka – Kóta pass – Vidly – Vrbno pod Pradědem

=== Ski trails ===
Near Andělská Hora, at the base of the southeastern slope, there is a ski resort named Ski Annaberg, with a parking area near road number 452. During the snowy season, the following downhill skiing and snowboarding trails with lifts are available on Anenský vrch:

Downhill skiing and snowboarding trails with lifts from Anenský vrch
| Number | Trail name and designation | Trail length (meters) | Elevation difference (meters) | Lift type | Lift length (meters) |
| 1 | Hlavní 1 | 750 | 125 | T-bar lift | 800 |
| 2 | Okolo lesa 4 | 1,150 | 125 | T-bar lift | 800 |
| 3 | Snowboard park 5 | 350 | 60 | T-bar lift | 300 |
| 4 | Dětské hřiště 6 | 50 | 10 | T-bar lift | 50 |

Moreover, a cross-country skiing trail known as the Jesenická magistrála is marked on a section of the red hiking trail and other paths.
