= Žárový vrch =

Mountain in the Czech Republic

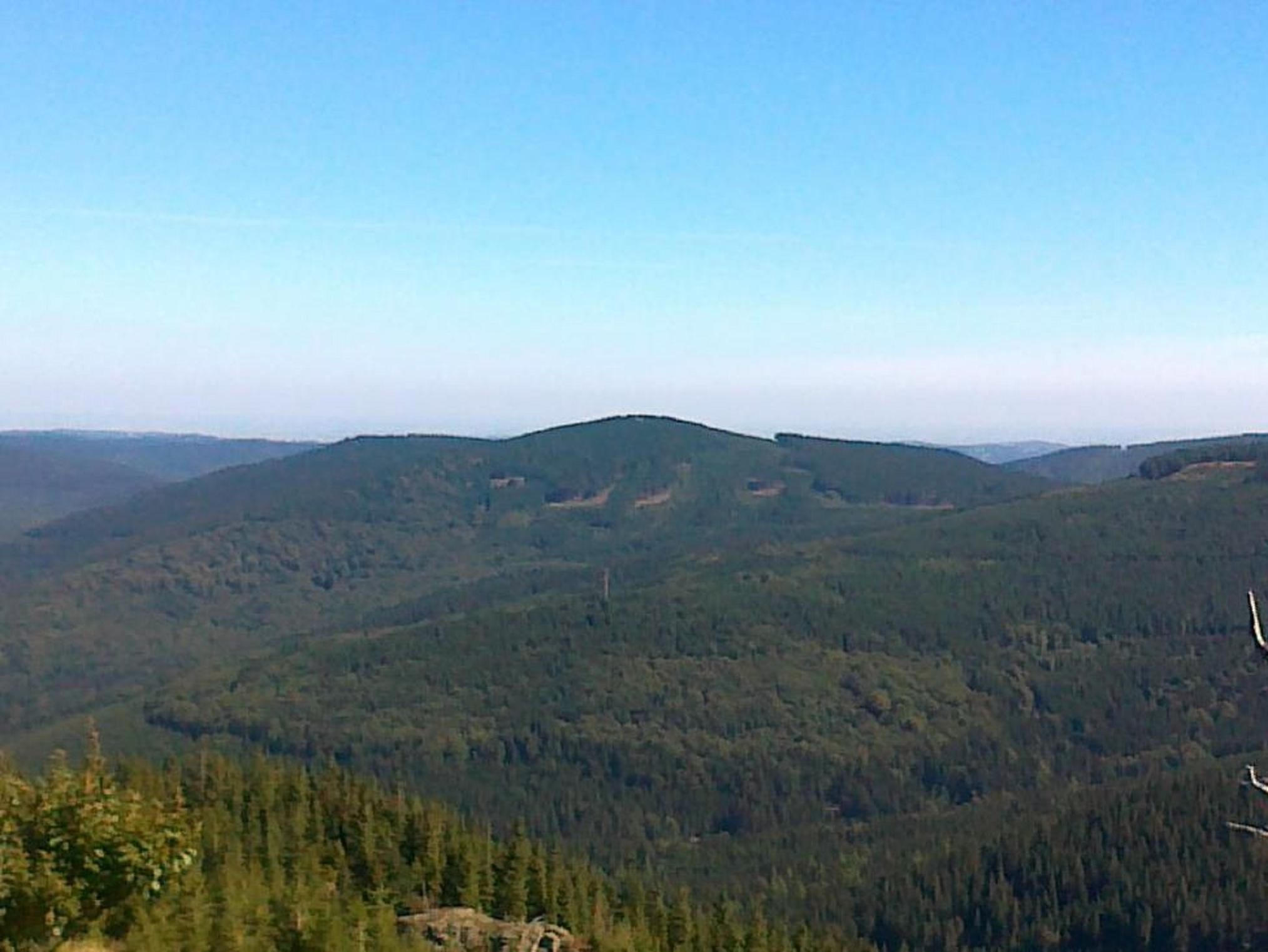
- View from the summit slope of Sokol Mountain to Žárový vrch (below, faintly visible Bučina and Lyra, behind it part of Vysoká hora)

Highest point
- Elevation: 1,101 m (3,612 ft)
- Prominence: 148
- Isolation: 3.6 km (2.2 mi)
- Coordinates: 50°6′32″N 17°18′39″E

Geography
- Location within Czech Republic
- Location: Ludvíkov
- Country: Czech Republic
- Parent range: Hrubý Jeseník

Žárový vrch (German: Brandberg) is a mountain in the Hrubý Jeseník mountain range in the Czech Republic. It has an elevation of 1,101 m (3,612 ft) above sea level. It is located in the municipality of Ludvíkov, about 6.4 km northeast of the summit of Praděd mountain. There is a scenic viewpoint on the peak rock formation. The mountain is located in the Jeseníky Protected Landscape Area. The Jelení bučina nature reserve has been established on part of the western slope.

== Characteristics ==
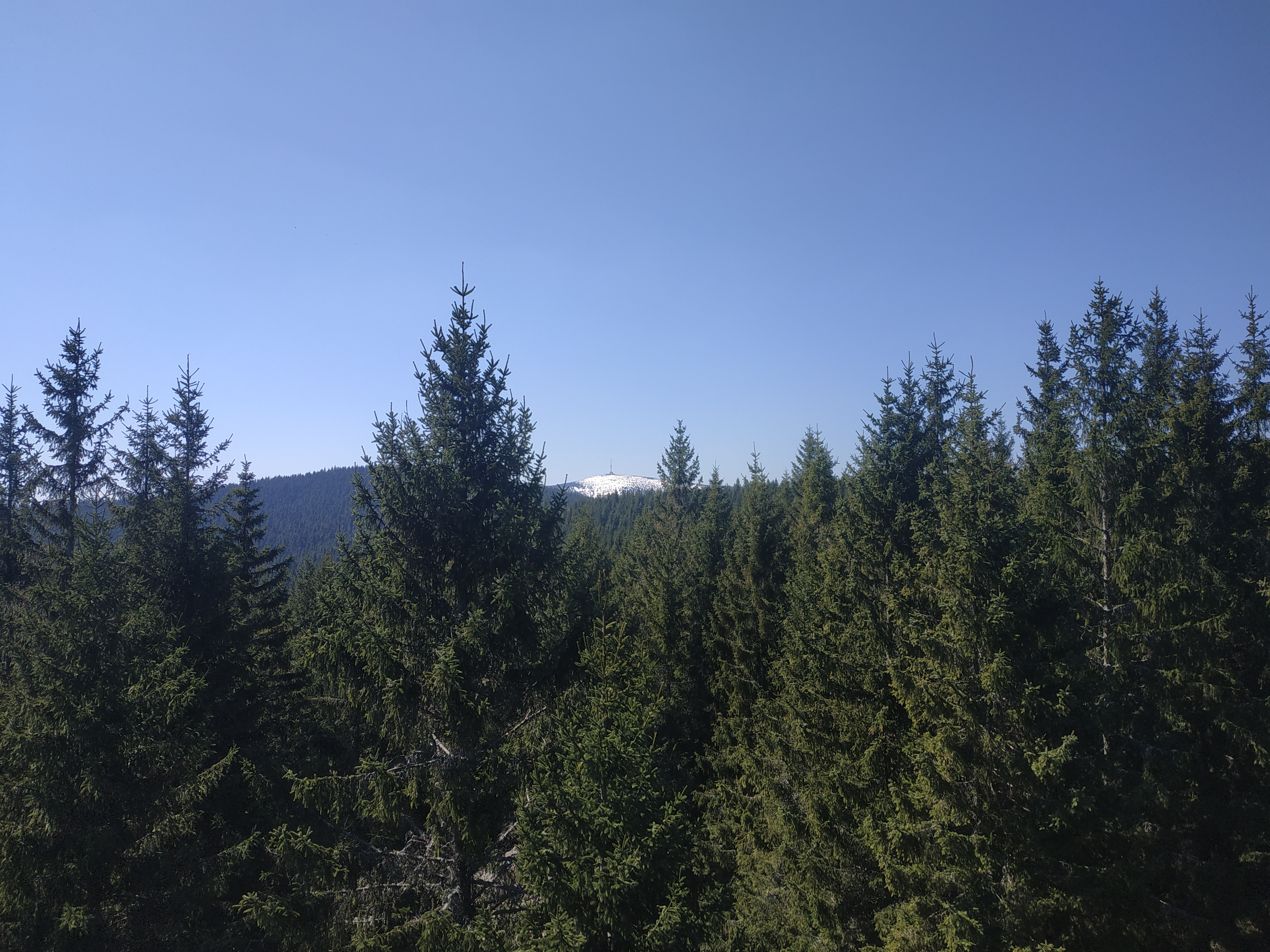
View from the summit cliffs of Plošina mountain towards the peaks of Žárový vrch and Praděd mountains

=== Location ===
Žárový vrch mountain is located slightly east of the centre of the entire Hrubý Jeseník range, lying in a part of the Hrubý Jeseník, in the central area of the Medvědí Mountains on a side arm, stretching from Kóta Pass to Zámecká hora mountain. Žárový vrch is a hard-to-recognize and not very distinctive mountain, located in the massif of three mountains: Lyra - Žárový vrch - Plošina, having heights above 1,000 meters above sea level. At the same time, it is one of the higher peaks of this ridge, located about 4 km north of Karlova Studánka, between the passing roads: No. 451 Nové Heřminovy - Vidly and No. 445 Šternberk - Zlaté Hory. It is a peak visible, among other things, from the road surrounding the summit area of Praděd mountain (the peak is visible to the left of the line of sight to Vysoká hora mountain, but is easily confused with the neighboring Lyra peak), and from another distinctive vantage point - from the road surrounding the summit of Dlouhé stráně mountain it is invisible because it is obscured by Velký Děd peak and Praděd mountain. The summit of Žárový vrch, on the other hand, is clearly visible from the summit rock of Lyra mountain or from the summit slope of Sokol mountain, among others.

The mountain is bounded by: from the northwest by the valley of the Střední Opava stream, from the northeast by a pass of 1,003 m (3,291 ft) above sea level toward the Plošina peak, from the east and southeast by a short unnamed tributary of the Bílá Opava stream, the Bílá Opava stream, two passes: one of 756 meters above sea level toward the Brantloch peak and another of 835 meters above sea level toward the Na vyhlídce (2) peak, (Note: Indexed designation in contrast to another peak of the same name in the same range: Na vyhlídce (1) located about 2.5 km northwest of Vrbno pod Pradědem) the valley of an unnamed tributary of the Bílá Opava stream to the south, and a 950-meter-high pass to the southwest toward Lyra peak and the valley of an unnamed tributary of the Střední Opava stream from that pass. Surrounding the mountain are the following peaks: from the northwest Mrazový vrch, Zlatá stráň-JV and Zadní plošina, from the north Skály (Note: Indexed designation in contrast to another peak in the same range with the same name, Skály, located at the settlement of Kouty nad Desnou) and Jelení kameny, from the northeast Plošina, from the southeast Brantloch and Na vyhlídce (2), from the south Rolandův kámen and from the southwest Lyra, Bučina and Nad kapličkou.

=== Slopes ===
The following five major slopes can be distinguished within the mountain:

- eastern, stretching from the main summit to the pass towards the summit of Brantloch
- southern, the longest with a length of about 2.5 km, stretching from the main summit to the valley of an unnamed stream, which is a tributary of the Bílá Opava stream
- southwestern, named Pytlácká skála, the shortest with a length of about 950 m, stretching from the main peak to the pass towards the Lyra peak
- western, stretching from the main peak to the valley of the Střední Opava stream (more or less to the lowest parts of the Jelení bučina nature reserve)
- northwestern, stretching from the main summit to the valley of the Střední Opava (more or less around the mouth of an unnamed stream - a tributary of the Střední Opava; at the foot of this slope, near the place named Ptačí Mlýn, is the lowest point of the mountain, which has an altitude of about 627 m)

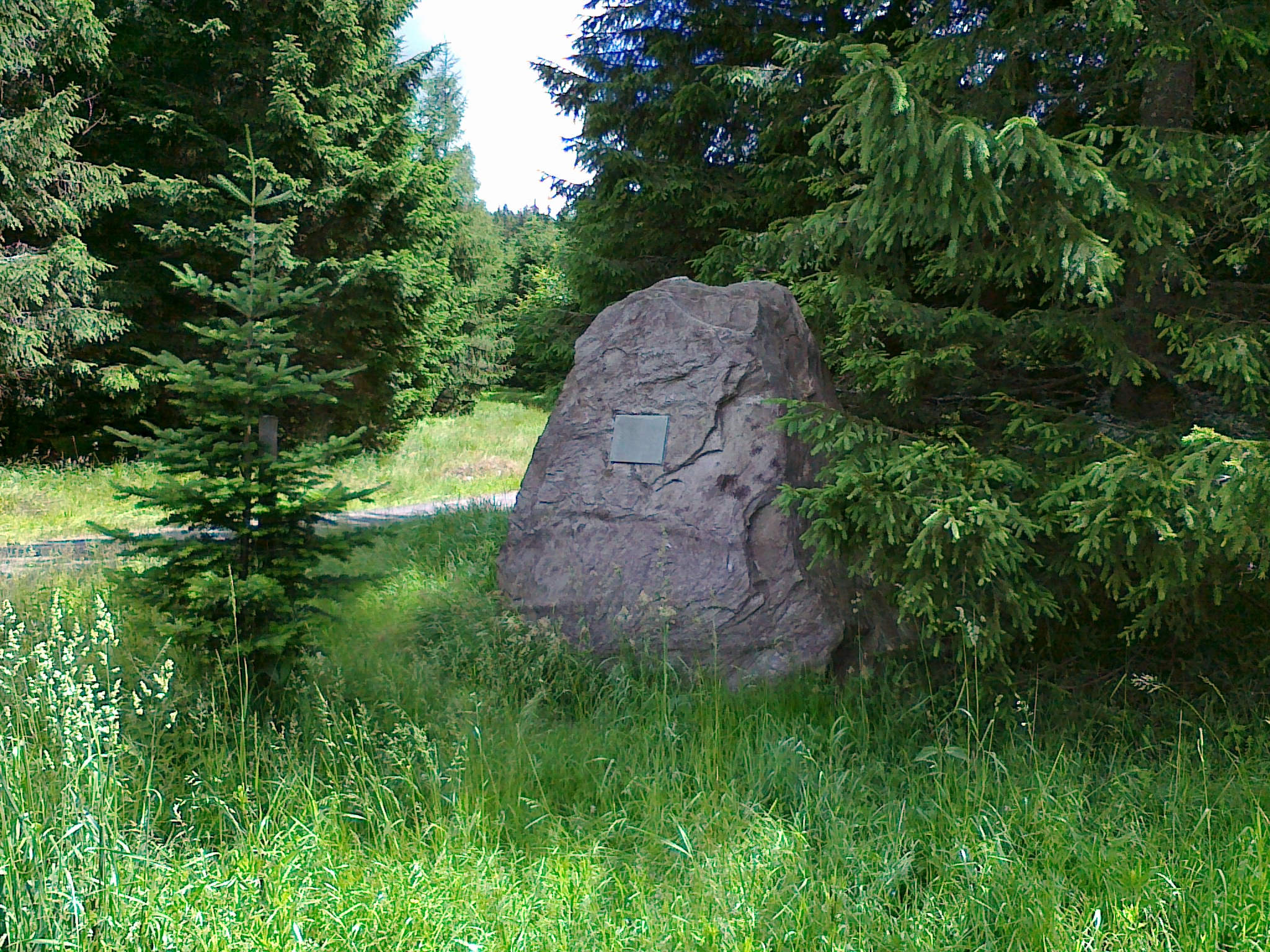
Boulder with memorial plaque on the pass between Lyra and Žárový vrch peaks

All forestation types are present: spruce forest, mixed coniferous forest (Note: The forest stand of the entire Jesioniki Protected Landscape Area includes: Norway spruce 84%, European beech 10%, European larch 1.5%, sycamore 1.1%, birch 1%, black alder 0.8%, dwarf pine 0.4%, grey alder 0.3% (silver fir, ash and linden) 0.2%, red pine 0, 1%, others (mountain pine, oak, hornbeam, Norway maple, elm, rowan, green alder, aspen, poplar and goat willow) 0.2% (Analýza vlivu lesního hospodaření na lesní ekosystémy v CHKO Jeseníky. (PDF)).) and deciduous forest, with spruce forestation definitely dominating. The southwestern slope is mostly covered with spruce forest, while the other slopes with decreasing elevation are covered with mixed coniferous forest and deciduous forest in addition to spruce forest. On almost all slopes there are glades, firebreaks and slight stubble. At the foot of the eastern slopes, near road No. 445, and the northwestern slopes, near road No. 451, run 22 kV overhead electric transmission lines. The mountain is interspersed with numerous individual rocky outcrops and rock groups found on almost all slopes (including secondary peaks or the so-called Nedělní skála). In addition, on the western slope at an altitude of 850–915 meters above sea level, there is an area covered with boulders.

The slopes are relatively uniform, generally gentle and with little variation. The average slope varies from 8° (southwestern slope) to 16° (northwestern slope). The average slope of all mountainsides of the mountain (weighted arithmetic mean of slopes) is about 12°. The maximum slope of the northwestern slope near the road named Chladná cesta at a distance of 50 m does not exceed 40°. The slopes are covered by a network of numerous roads (including Chladná cesta, Čtverková cesta, Do Brantlochu, Šestková cesta, U Ptačího Mlýna or Zámecká cesta) and generally unmarked paths and ducts. When traversing them, it is advisable to use detailed maps, due to the intricacies of their course, forest cover and orientation in the terrain.

Slopes of Žárový vrch mountain
Number	Slope	Length of slope m	Overshoot m	Average slope
1	Southwestern	970	140	8°
2	Southern	2525	385	9°
3	Northwestern	1470	425	16°
4	Eastern	2300	470	12°
5	Western	1640	365	13°

At the foot of the southwestern slope, near the pass towards the Lyra peak, opposite the cottage named Sedlová chata, there is a boulder on which a metal memorial plaque with an inscription has been placed (the inscription is now barely legible).

=== Main summit ===
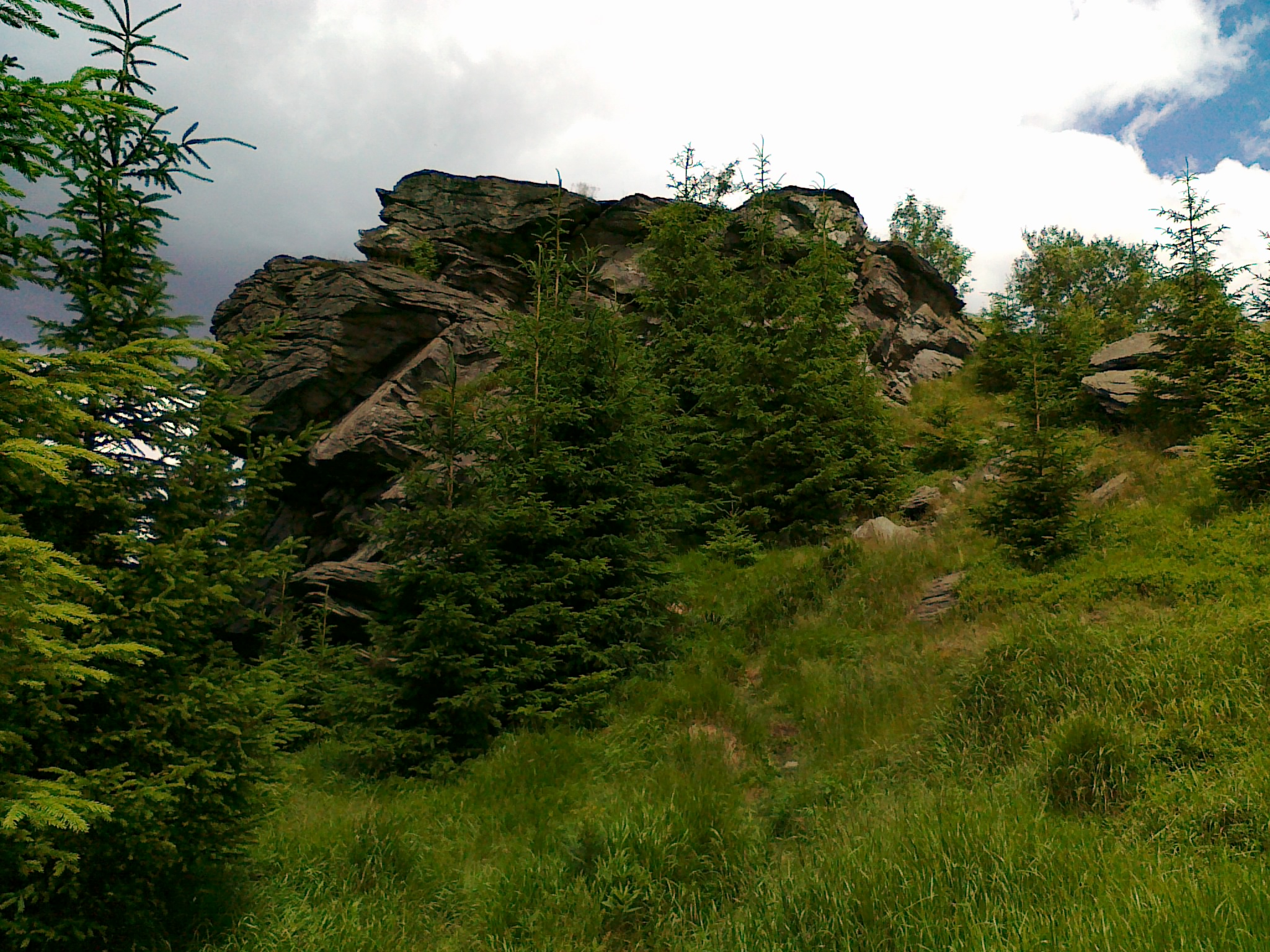
Peak rock formation of Žárový vrch mountain (2016)

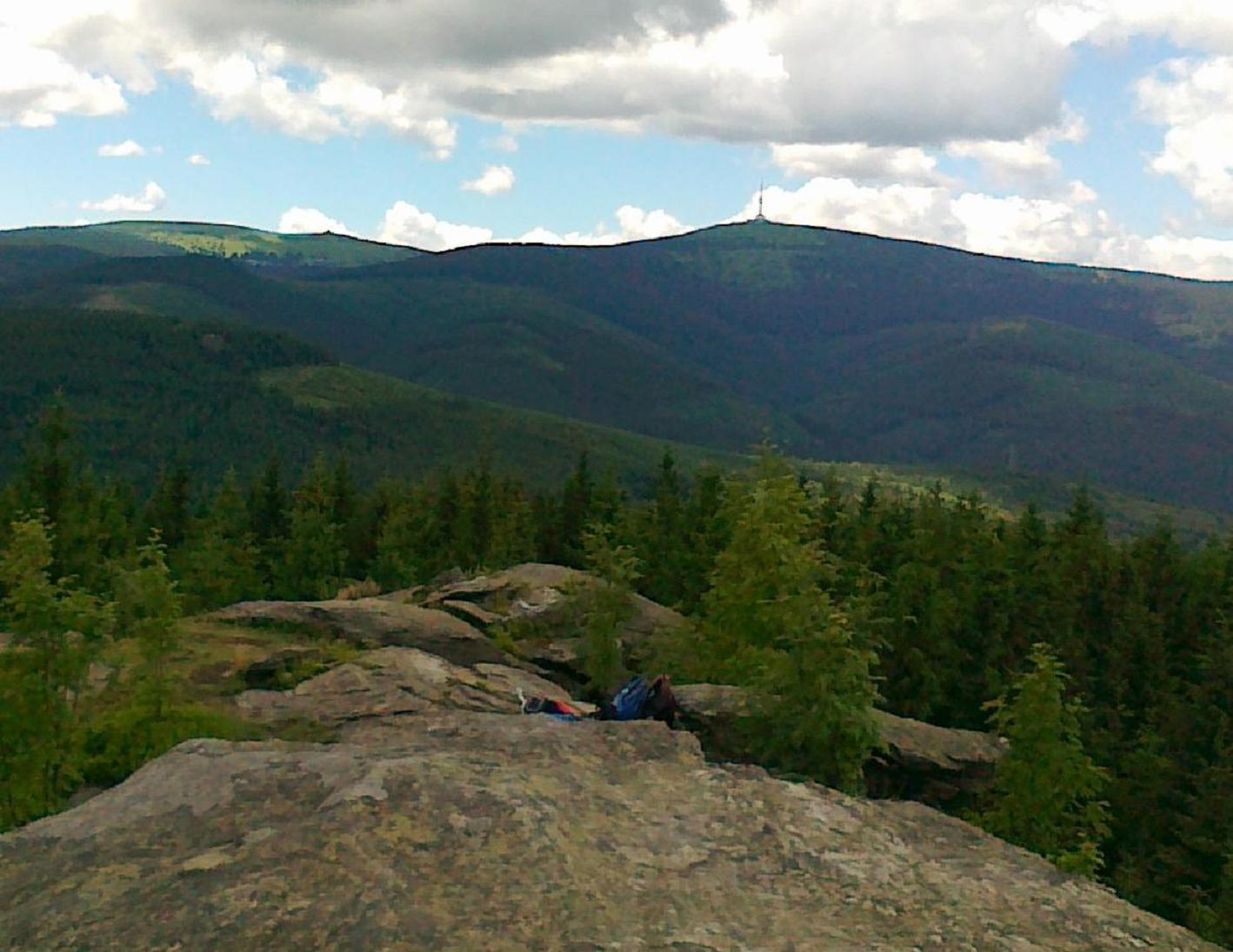
View from the summit rock of Žárový vrch mountain towards the peaks of Vysoká hole, Petrovy kameny and Praděd

No hiking trail leads to the summit. A ridge main path passes through the summit slope, stretching from the mountain pass towards Lyra peak to the secondary summit of Žárový vrch-SV and on to Plošina peak, marked by two white horizontal stripes. The peak is a rocky outcrop, located on a rock group with horizontal dimensions of 76 × 24 m, surrounded by spruce forest all around and covered with a very popular plant found almost all over the Hrubý Jeseník, namely European blueberry. The summit rock is a scenic viewpoint from which there are picturesque perspectives towards the peaks of, among others: Praděd, Vysoká hole and Petrovy kameny and the peaks of, among others, the microregion of the Hrubý Jeseník called Keprník Mountains. There is a major triangulation station on the summit slope, marked on geodetic maps with the number 14. The highest point of the mountain has an altitude of 1,100.9 m (3,612 ft) above sea level.

Access to the summit cliff is from the green bicycle trail and the tourist intersection named Sedlová bouda, from where there is a ridge main path (marked with two horizontal white stripes), which should be followed for a distance of about 970 m, marked in a clearing (almost in a straight line) from the pass towards the Lyra summit.

=== Secondary summits ===
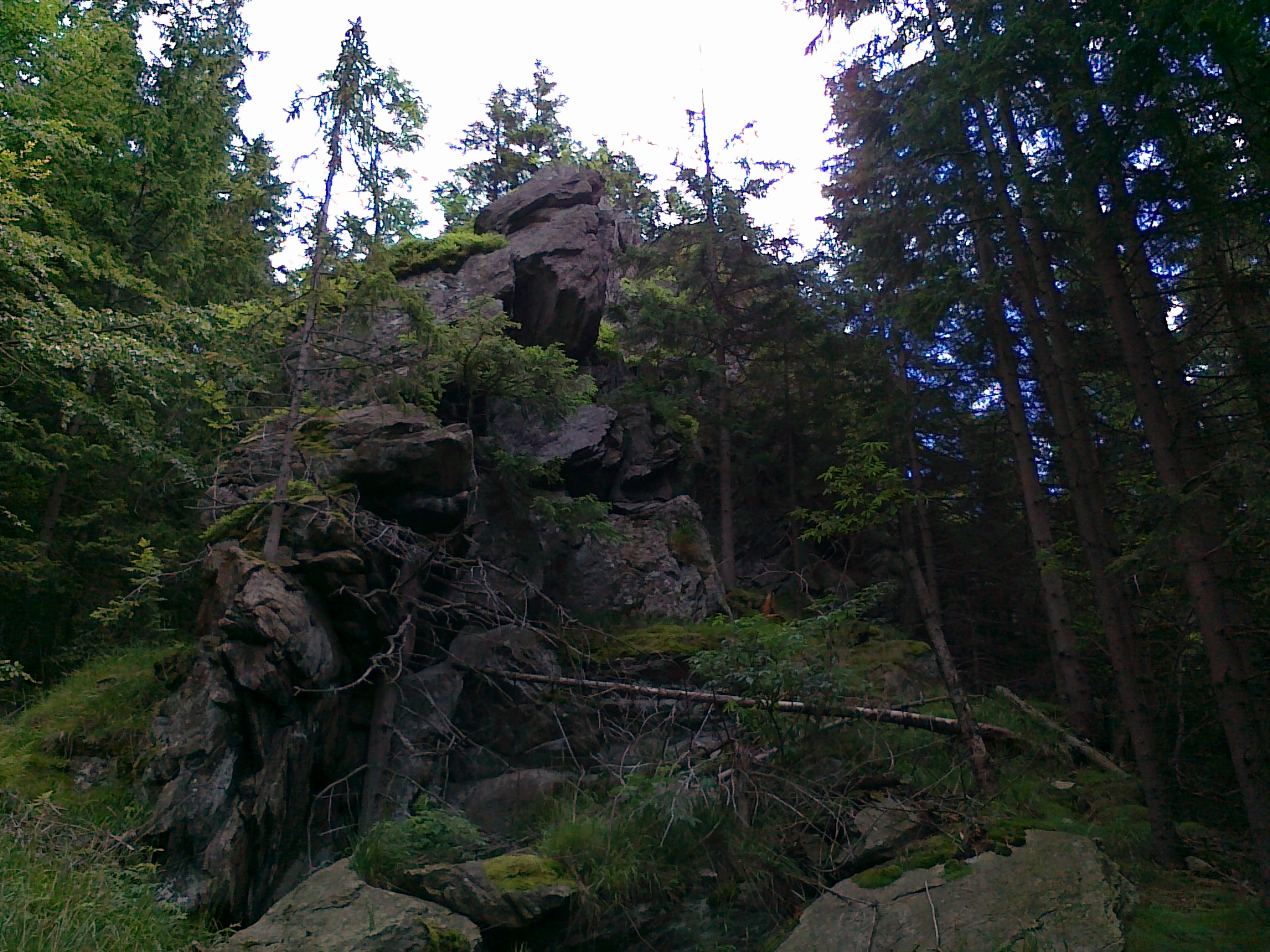
Rock formation of the secondary summit named Žárový vrch-JZ

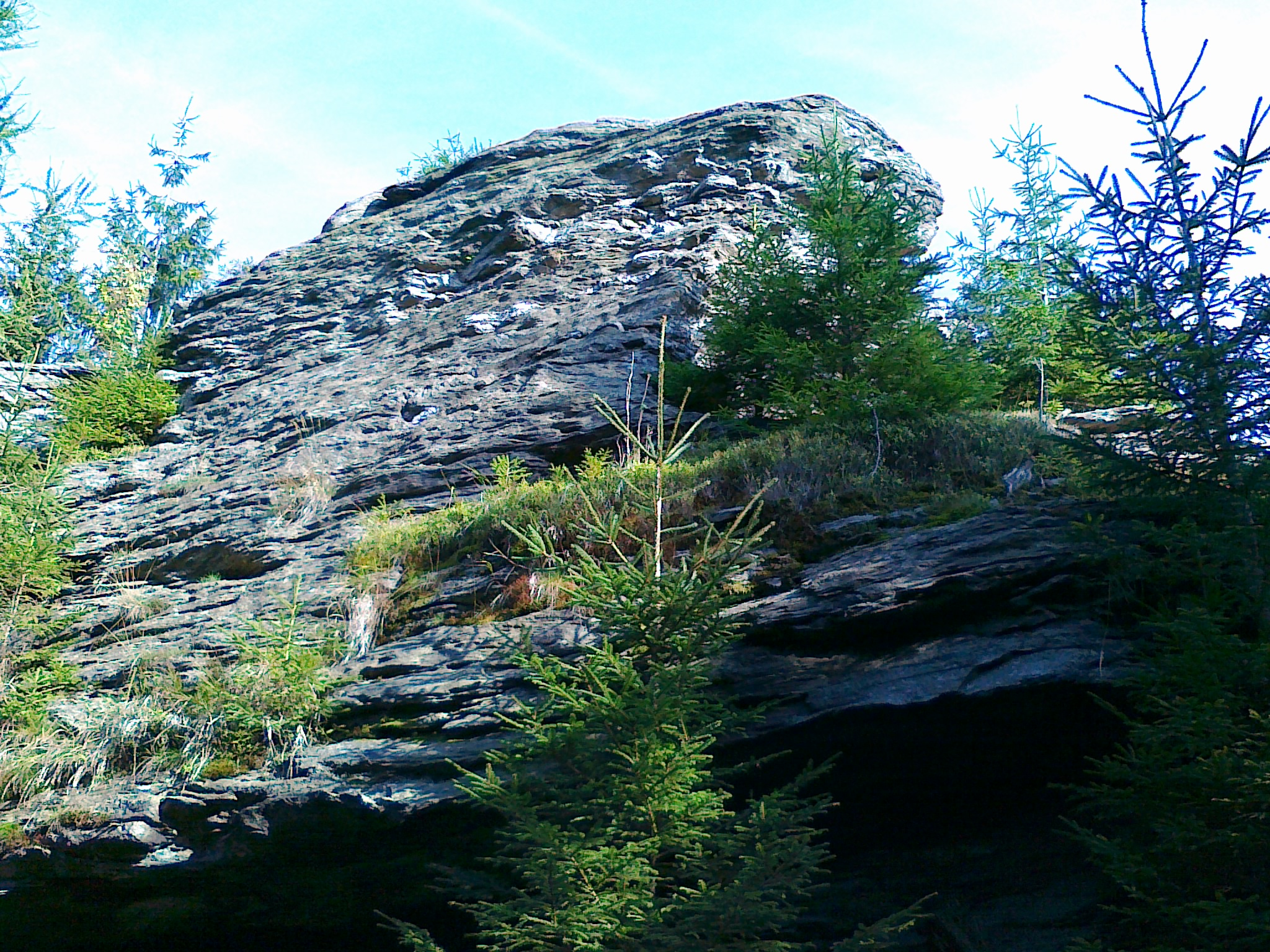
Rock formation of the secondary summit named Žárový vrch-SV

Žárový vrch is a mountain with a quadruple summit. In the entire massif of the mountain, in addition to the main peak, three lower secondary peaks can be distinguished.

Secondary summits of Žárový vrch mountain
Number	Summit	Altitude meters above sea level	Distance from the main summit meters	Geographical coordinates
1	Žárový vrch–SZ (Note: According to the State Administration of Land Surveying and Cadastre, the secondary peak of Žárový vrch-SZ is marked as Kamzičí skály.)	1047	410 na północny zachód	50°06′36.2″N 17°18′19.6″E
2	Žárový vrch–SV	1045	850 na północny wschód	50°06′55.1″N 17°19′04.0″E
3	Žárový vrch–JZ	1012	610 na południowy zachód	50°06′15.9″N 17°18′19.6″E

=== Triangulation stations ===
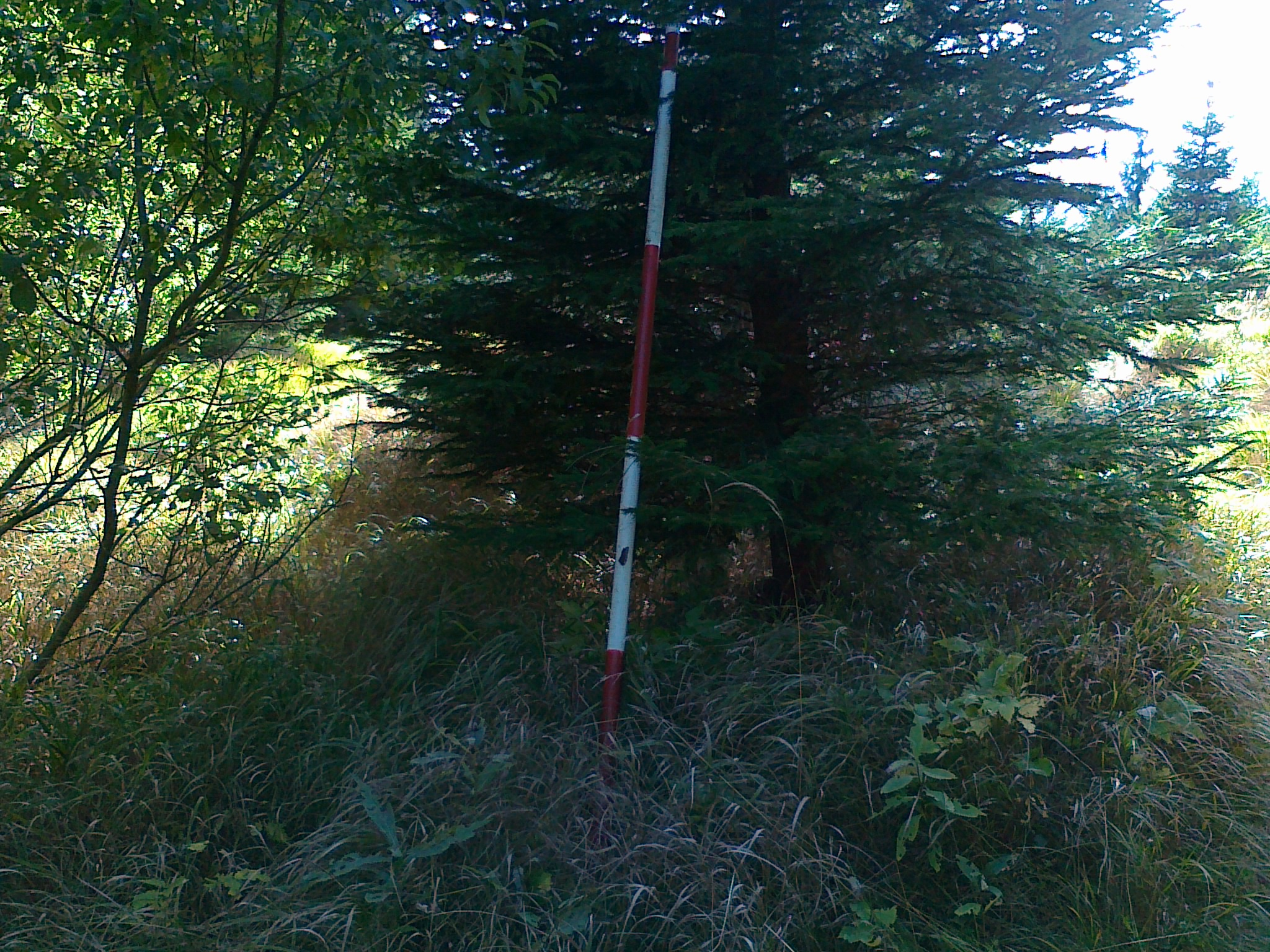
Triangulation station no. 14 at the peak rock formation of Žárový vrch

There are two trigonometrical stations on the summit slope. The main trigonometrical station, which is often shown on maps as the main summit of the mountain, has a broken steel post located next to it. A second trigonometrical station is located a little further along the ridge's main path. The other two secondary trigonometrical stations are located on the eastern slope close to the road named To Brantloch.

Triangulation stations of Žárový vrch mountain
Number	Triangulation station	Altitude meters above sea level	Distance from the main summit meters	Geographical coordinates
1	14	1093,82	25 to the southeast	50°06′31.51″N 17°18′40.37″E
2	14.1	1094,50	90 to the northeast	50°06′32.98″N 17°18′43.21″E
3	17	815,44	1590 to the southeast	50°05′59.84″N 17°19′41.26″E
4	17.1	807,94	1430 to the southeast	50°06′06.13″N 17°19′38.87″E

=== Geology ===
Geologically, the Žárový vrch mountain massif belongs to the unit referred to as the Desna dome and is built of metamorphic rocks, mainly: blastomylonites (biotites, chlorites and muscovites), magmatic rocks, mainly metagranitoids, and sedimentary rocks, mainly: metaaleurites. On the slopes there are so-called cryoplanation terraces, formed in the frigid periglacial climate.

=== Waters ===
The peaks, along with the slopes of Žárový vrch mountain, are located northeast of this border, and thus belong to the catchment area of the Baltic Sea, into which water flows from, among other things, the basin of the Oder River, which is an extension of the mountain streams flowing from this part of the Hrubý Jeseník (including streams Bílá Opava and Střední Opava, which flow near the mountain. Short, unnamed streams, which are tributaries of the aforementioned Bílá Opava and Střední Opava streams, originate from the slopes. Most of the headwaters of the streams flowing from the slopes are located in marshes. Due to the relatively gentle slopes, there are no waterfalls or cascades within the mountain.

=== Springs ===
There are numerous springs on the slopes.

Springs on the slopes of Žárový vrch mountain
Number	Spring (designation)	Distance from the summit meters	Absolute altitude meters above sea level	Geographical coordinates
1	Studánka (3665)	920 to the north	890	50°07′01″N 17°18′40″E
2	Studánka (5797)	960 to the east	878	50°06′33″N 17°19′27″E
3	Studánka Živá voda	1860 to the north	640	50°07′31″N 17°18′36″E

== Nature conservation ==
The entire mountain is located within the Jeseníky Protected Landscape Area, and created to protect rock, earth and plant formations, as well as rare animal species, with the Jelení bučina nature reserve located within it, on part of the mountain's western slope.

Outside the area of the Jelení bučina Nature Reserve, a 26.5 km (16.5 mi)-long educational trail named Naučná stezka Muzeum Wide Web with the following route was laid out on short sections of the eastern slope of the mountain and at the foot of the mountain by road No. 445:

- Malá Morávka - Karlovice (with 17 observation posts along the route)

In addition, at the foot of the eastern slope, about 2.2 kilometers southeast of the summit, at an altitude of about 650 meters above sea level, there is an old ash tree that was declared a memorial named Jasan v bývalém areálu Jitřenka in 2000, with a height of about 27 m and a trunk circumference of 412 cm.

=== Jelení bučina Nature Reserve ===
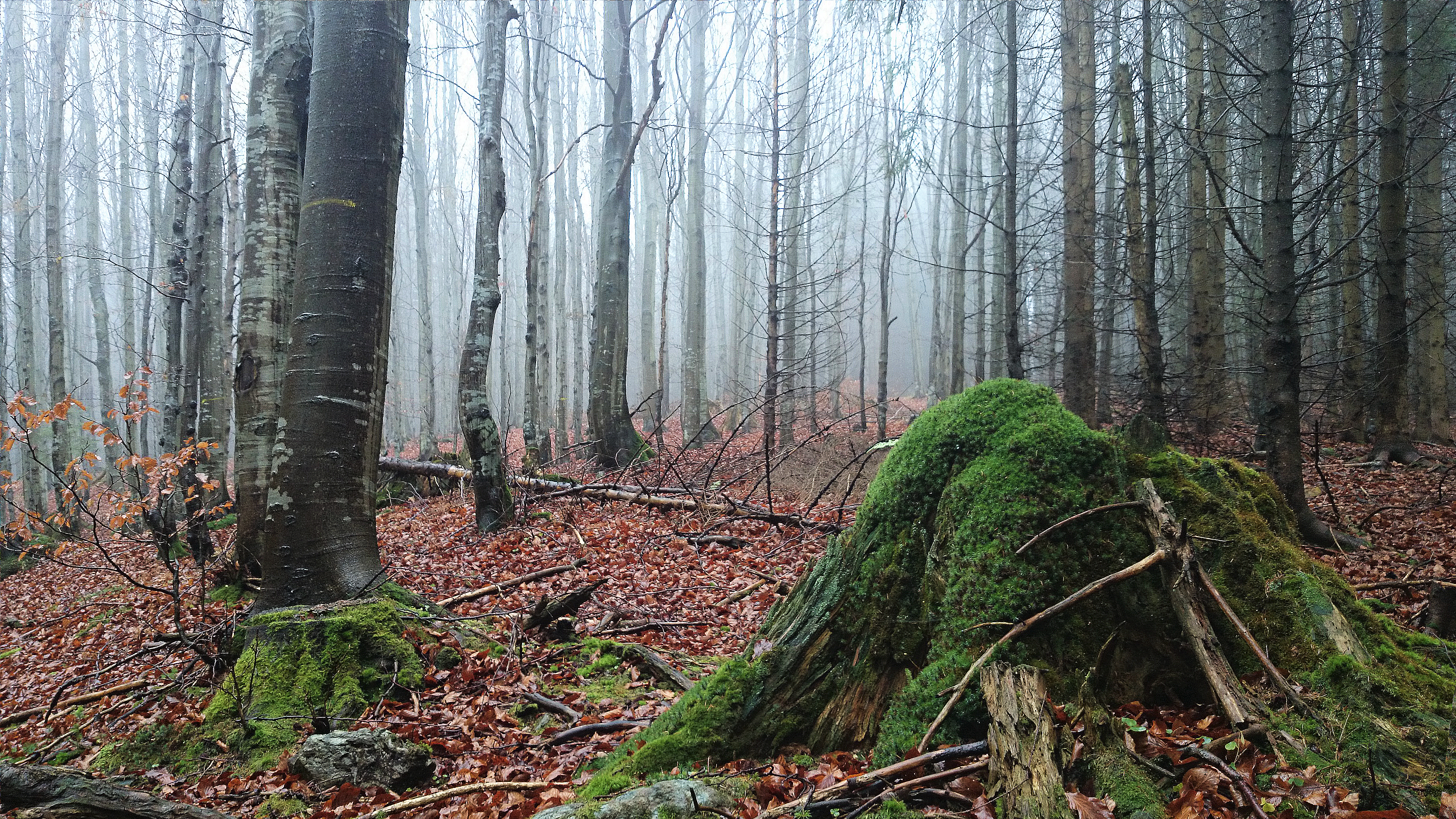
View of the Jelení bučina Nature Reserve

The Jelení bučina Nature Reserve is located at an altitude of 712–930 meters above sea level on the slope of the mountain and extends from the valley of the Middle Opava stream towards the road Zámecká cesta and has an area of 45.84 hectares and 14.07 hectares (in addition) of a 50-meter wide buffer zone.

The reserve is located about 5 km northeast of the summit of Praděd mountain and about 800 m west of the main peak of Žárový vrch. The reserve was established on 14 December 1990 to protect a primary mixed coniferous forest with a dominant beech stand and its surrounding flora and fauna. There are a number of boulders and rocky outcrops in the reserve. There is no trail blazing or educational trail through the reserve. A path from the Zámecká cesta road, among others, passes through its area.

== Tourism ==
There is no mountain hut or hotel on the top of Žárový vrch. The key tourist point is a tourist junction (Sedlová bouda) about 1 km southwest of the summit, with an elevation of 950 m listed on the information board, through which pass a cycling route and cross-country ski trails.

=== Hunting huts ===
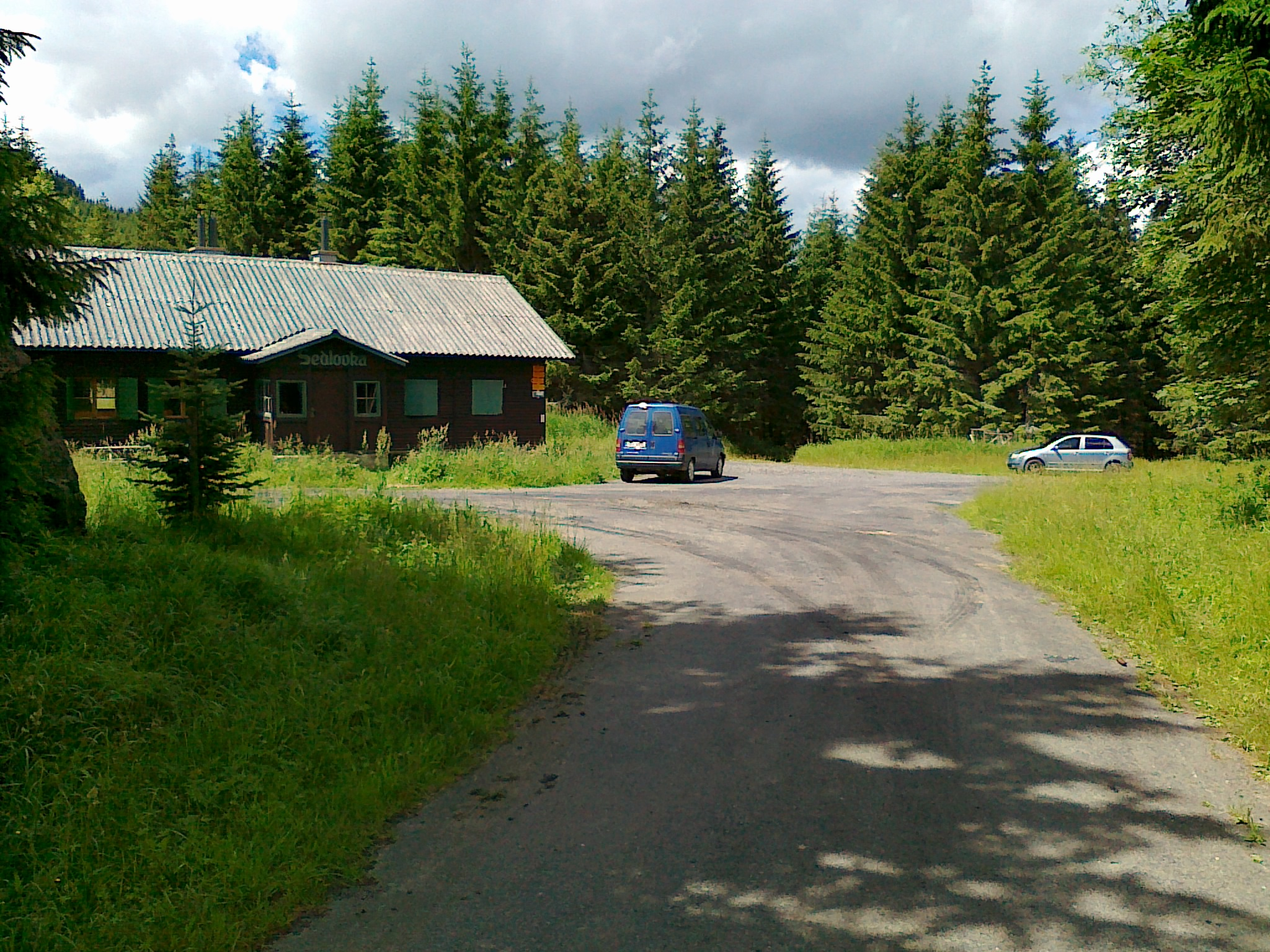
View of the pass between Lyra and Žárový vrch mountains and Sedlovka hut

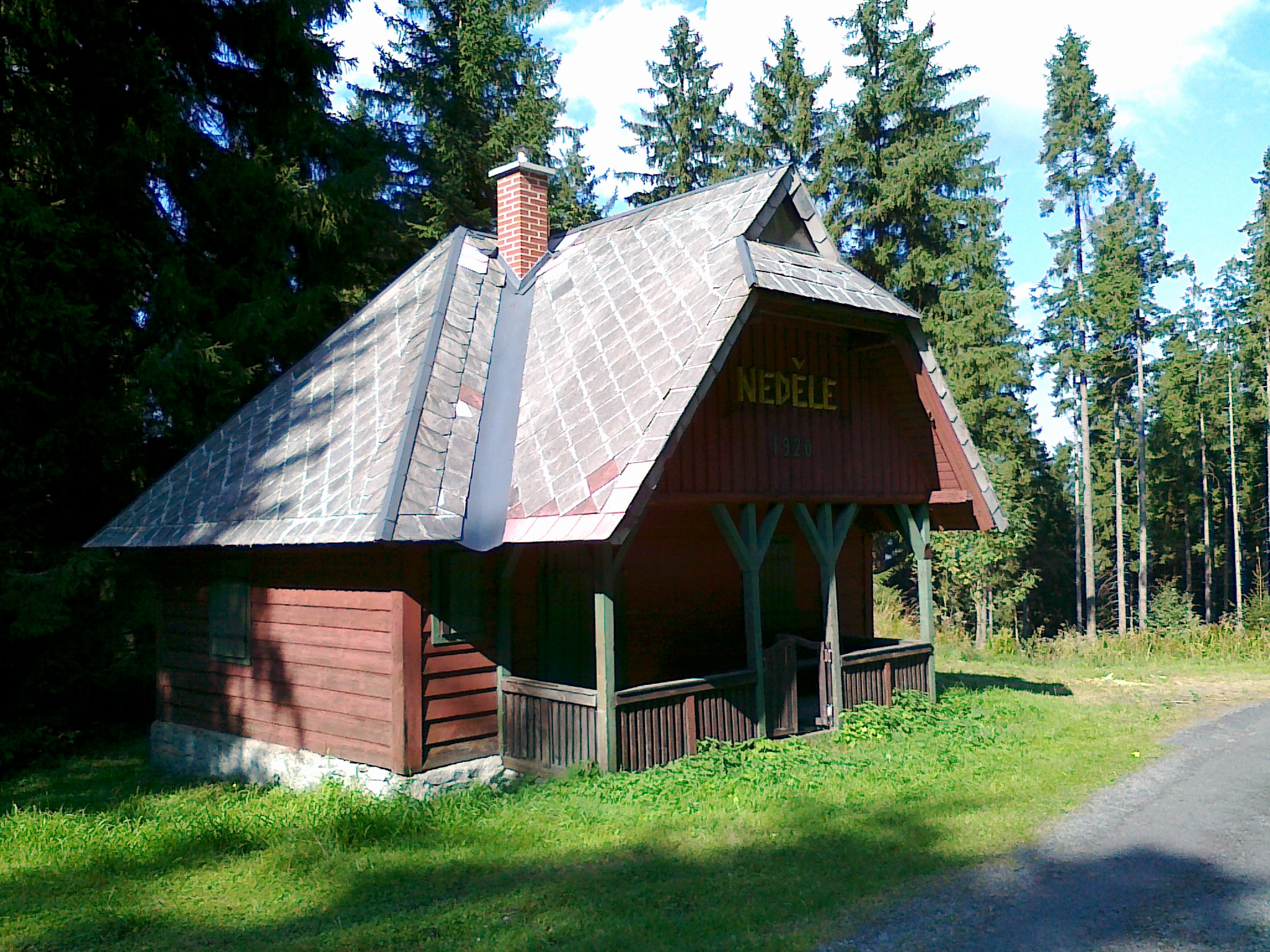
Chata Neděle

There are three huts on the slopes of the mountain, but they do not have the character of typical mountain shelters, they are classified as so-called hunting huts. They are accessible from the road called Zámecká cesta, as they are all located near it.

Huts on the slopes of Žárový vrch mountain
Number	Hut	Distance from the summit meters	Location	Geographical coordinates
1	Chata Neděle	1110 to the north	the slope of the secondary peak of Žárový vrch-SV on the Zámecká cesta road	50°07′07.4″N 17°18′46.1″E
2	Pytlácká chata	830 to the northwest	the slope of the secondary peak Žárový vrch-SZ, close to the road Zámecká cesta	50°06′42.2″N 17°18′00.4″E
3	Sedlová chata (Sedlovka)	990 to the southwest	at the tourist junction Sedlová bouda	50°06′08.0″N 17°18′05.5″E

=== Hiking trails ===
Czech Tourist Club has not established any hiking trails within the mountain.

=== Cycling routes ===
Two cycling routes have been routed through the slopes and along Road 445 on trails:

Vrbno pod Pradědem - Zámecká hora mountain - Plošina mountain - Žárový vrch-SV mountain - Žárový vrch mountain - Lyra mountain - Lyra-J mountain - Kóta Pass

(No. 553) Drakov - Vrbno near Praděd - Ludvíkov - Karlova Studánka - Hvězda Pass - Malá Morávka - Dolní Moravice - Harrachovský kopec mountain - Rýmařov mountain

=== Ski trails ===
During periods of snowy weather, one can use the mountain's designated cross-country ski trail:

Karlova Studánka – Skalnatý vrch – Lyra mountain – Žárový vrch mountain – Plošina mountain – Zámecká hora mountain – Vrbno pod Pradědem

No downhill piste has been routed within the mountain.

== Bibliography ==
- "Jeseníky". ultratisicovky.cz (in Czech). Archived from the original on 2022-10-05.
- Banaszkiewicz, Piotr; Parzewski, Jerzy (2019), Jesioniki, Góry Opawskie. Mapa turystyczna: skala 1:50 000 (in Polish and Czech) (1 ed.), Cracow: Wydawnictwo Kartograficzne „Compass”, ISBN 9788376059419, OCLC 1150586280
- Brygier, Waldemar; Gałęcki, Adam; Jońca, Rafał; Sibielec, Monika; Wojciechowski, Dariusz (2017), Jesioniki. Pradziad, Jeseník: skala 1:40 000 (in Polish and Czech), Wrocław: Studio Plan, ISBN 9788365689757, OCLC 1036547484
- Chráněná Krajinná Oblast Jeseníky jih. Turistická a cykloturistická mapa 1:25 000, Eurocart (in Czech) (1 ed.), Česká Lípa: Geodézie On Line, 2010, ISBN 9788087380185, OCLC 865043859
- Chráněná Krajinná Oblast Jeseníky sever. Turistická a cykloturistická mapa 1:25 000, Eurocart (in Czech) (1 ed.), Česká Lípa: Geodézie On Line, 2010, ISBN 9788087380178, OCLC 865043841
- Cymerman, Zbigniew (1998), "Spory o podział geologiczny Sudetów. (PDF)", Przegląd Geologiczny, vol. 46, no. 6, pp. 530–536, ISSN 0033-2151, OCLC 995455330, archived from the original on 2018-12-11
- "Geologická mapa 1:50 000", mapy.geology.cz (in Czech), Česká geologická služba
- "Geoprohlížeč – ZÚ (Geoportal Czech)", ags.cuzk.cz (in Czech), Český Úřad Zeměměřický a Katastrální
- "Historie jesenické přírody. (PDF)" (PDF), jeseniky.ochranaprirody.cz (in Czech), archived from the original (PDF) on 2021-11-13
- Hnutí DUHA a přátelé Jeseníků (2002). "Analýza vlivu lesního hospodaření na lesní ekosystémy v CHKO Jeseníky. (PDF)" (PDF). hnutiduha.cz (in Czech). Archived from the original (PDF) on 11 August 2022.
- "Hrubý Jeseník (mapa) (JPEG)", dudisoft.eu (in Czech), archived from the original on 2016-03-04
- Jeseníky – Praděd, Králický Sněžník. Turistická mapa 1:40 000 (in Czech), Zádveřice: SHOCart, 2018, ISBN 9788072247363, OCLC 1103831608
- "View", heywhatsthat.com
- "Wysoki Jesionik (mapa turystyczna) 1:192 000", mapy.cz (in Czech and Polish)
