= Ludvíkov =

- Municipality
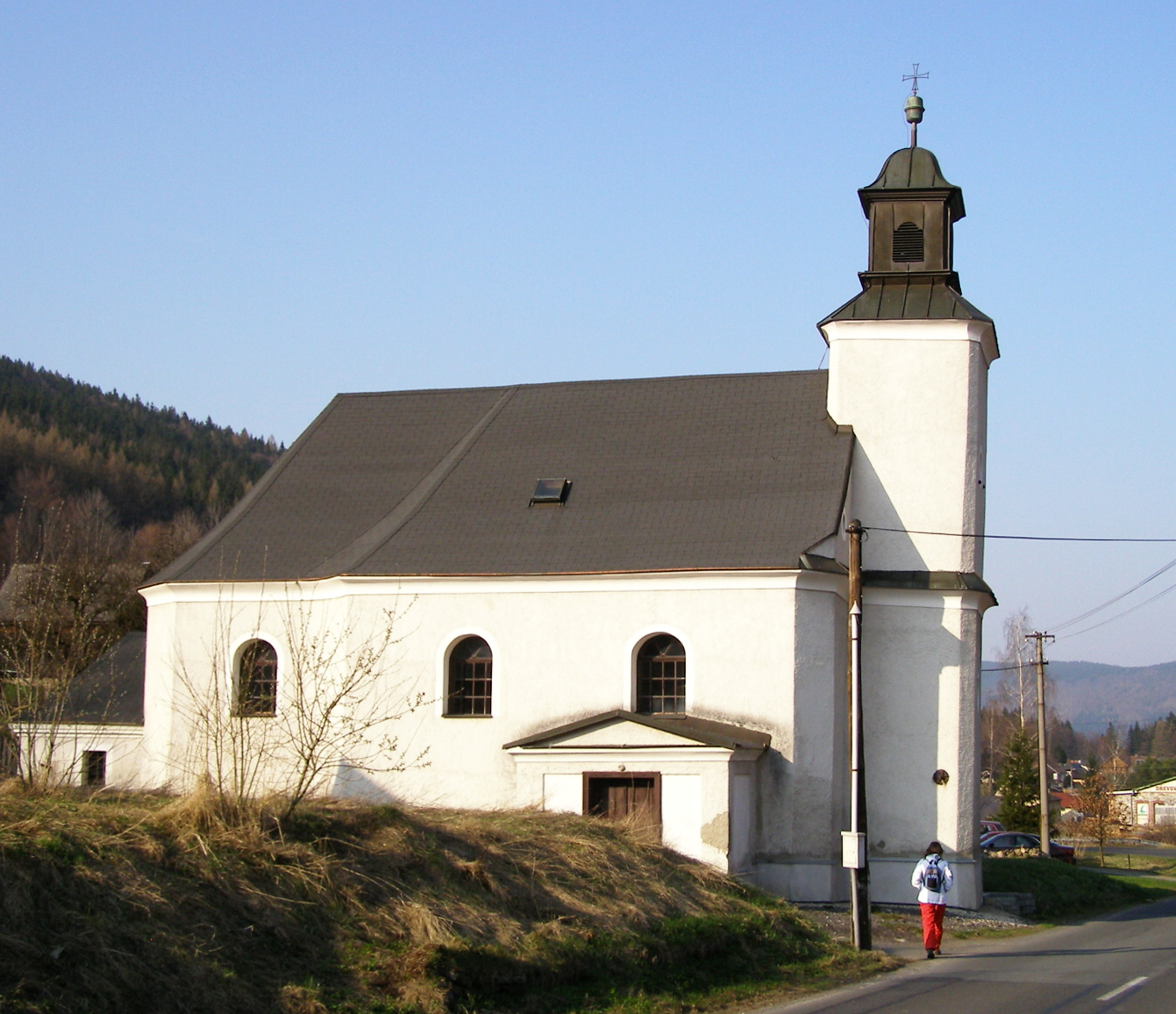
- Church of the Nativity of the Virgin Mary

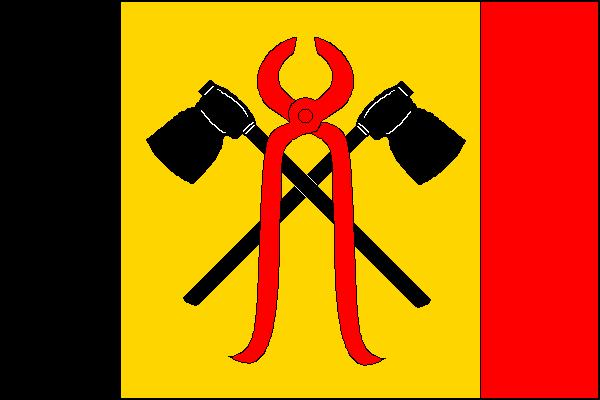
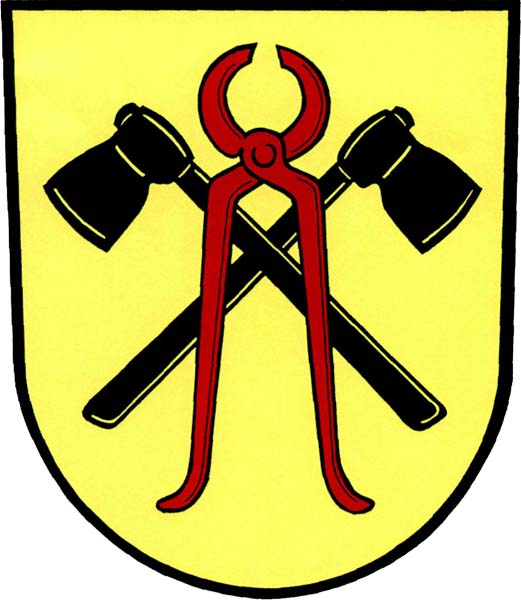
- Flag Coat of arms

- Location in the Czech Republic
- Coordinates: 50°6′27″N 17°20′32″E
- Country: Czech Republic
- Region: Moravian-Silesian
- District: Bruntál
- First mentioned: 1672

Area
  - Total: 21.12 km^{2} (8.15 sq mi)
- Elevation: 620 m (2,030 ft)

Population (2026-01-01)
  - Total: 272
  - Density: 12.9/km^{2} (33.4/sq mi)
- Time zone: UTC+1 (CET)
  - Summer (DST): UTC+2 (CEST)
- Postal code: 793 26
- Website: www.obecludvikov.cz

Ludvíkov (German: Ludwigsthal) is a municipality and village in Bruntál District in the Moravian-Silesian Region of the Czech Republic. It has about 300 inhabitants. It lies in the Hrubý Jeseník mountain range.

== Geography ==
Ludvíkov is located about 16 kilometres (10 mi) northwest of Bruntál and 57 km (35 mi) north of Olomouc. It lies in the Hrubý Jeseník mountain range. The highest point is the mountain Žárový vrch at 1,101 m (3,612 ft) above sea level. The Střední Opava stream, which is the source of the Opava River, flows along the western and northern municipal border. The Bílá Opava flows through the Ludvíkov village and joins the Střední Opava just outside the territory of Ludvíkov.

== History ==
The first written mention of the locality is from 1672, when Johann Caspar von Ampringen, Grand Master of the Teutonic Knights, founded here the first iron works and workers began to build houses here. However, the village was officially founded only in 1701 by the Grand Master Francis Louis of Palatinate-Neuburg. The main livelihood of the inhabitants was metallurgy. Until World War II, the village was predominantly German-speaking. After the German-speaking population was expelled in 1945, the village was resettled by Czechs, Slovaks and to a small extent by Romanians.

== Demographics ==
Historical population

| Year | Pop. | ±% |
|---|---|---|
| 1869 | 750 | — |
| 1880 | 733 | −2.3% |
| 1890 | 847 | +15.6% |
| 1900 | 860 | +1.5% |
| 1910 | 882 | +2.6% |

| Year | Pop. | ±% |
|---|---|---|
| 1921 | 803 | −9.0% |
| 1930 | 955 | +18.9% |
| 1950 | 448 | −53.1% |
| 1961 | 368 | −17.9% |
| 1970 | 402 | +9.2% |

| Year | Pop. | ±% |
|---|---|---|
| 1980 | 376 | −6.5% |
| 1991 | 299 | −20.5% |
| 2001 | 340 | +13.7% |
| 2011 | 316 | −7.1% |
| 2021 | 260 | −17.7% |

Source: Censuses

== Transport ==
There are no railways or major roads passing through the municipality.

== Sights ==
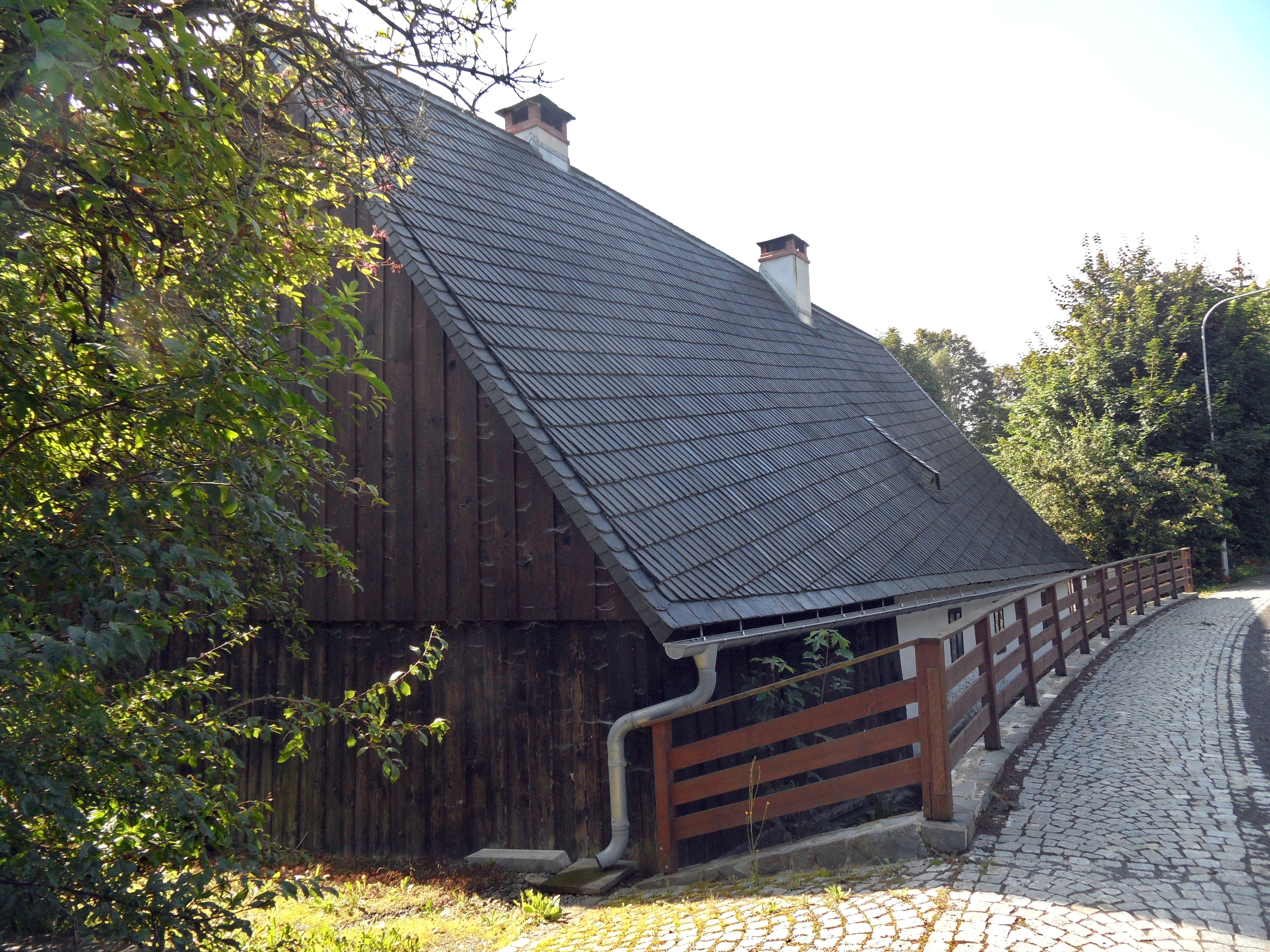
House No. 30

The main landmark of Ludvíkov is the Church of the Nativity of the Virgin Mary. It was built in the Baroque style in 1720. The interior is decorated with Rococo paintings.

Fürstenwalde is a ruin of a castle on the mountain Zámecká hora at 854 m (2,802 ft) above sea level, located north of the village. It is among the castles with the highest altitude in the Czech Republic. It was first mentioned in 1348 and was built shortly before this year. It was destroyed at the end of the 15th century. Only the foundations of the walls and the tower-like palace have survived to this day.

The third cultural monument of Ludvíkov is the house No. 30. It is a rural house from the end of the 18th century, a typical example of the vernacular architecture of the region (so-called East-Sudeten architecture).

A landmark in the centre of the village is a chapel, built in 1923 as a memorial to the victims of World War I.
