= Holčovice =

- Municipality
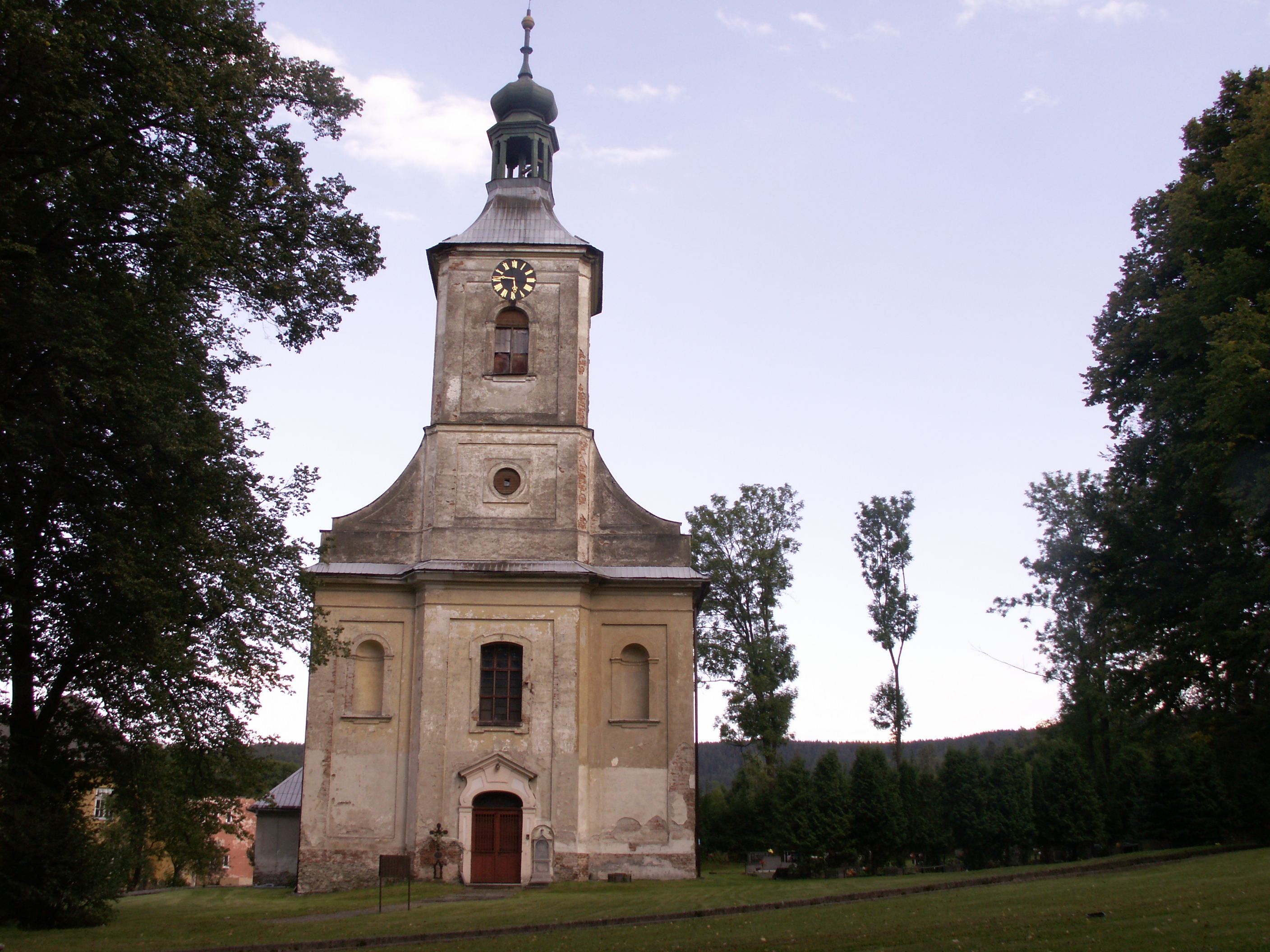
- Church of the Immaculate Conception

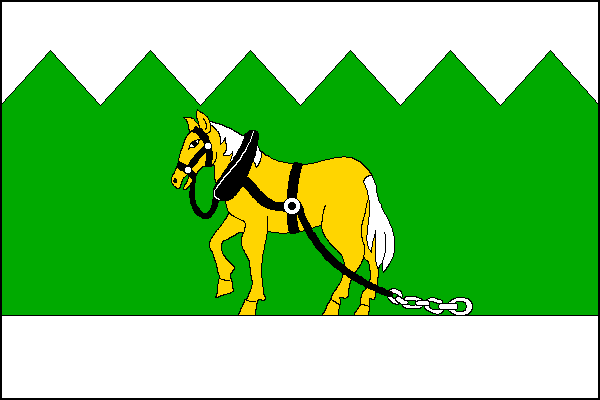
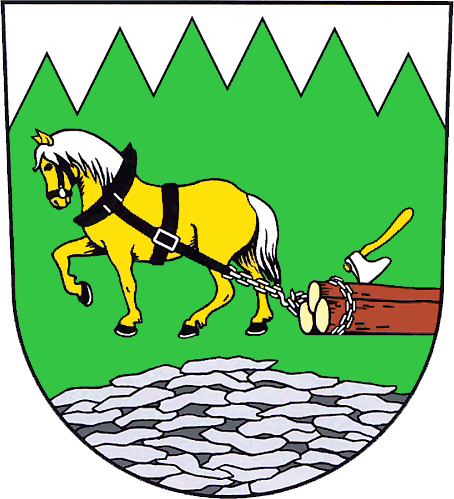
- Flag Coat of arms

- Location in the Czech Republic
- Coordinates: 50°9′24″N 17°29′10″E
- Country: Czech Republic
- Region: Moravian-Silesian
- District: Bruntál
- First mentioned: 1377

Area
  - Total: 40.57 km^{2} (15.66 sq mi)
- Elevation: 475 m (1,558 ft)

Population (2026-01-01)
  - Total: 723
  - Density: 17.8/km^{2} (46.2/sq mi)
- Time zone: UTC+1 (CET)
  - Summer (DST): UTC+2 (CEST)
- Postal code: 793 71
- Website: www.obecholcovice.cz

Holčovice (German: Hillersdorf) is a municipality and village in Bruntál District in the Moravian-Silesian Region of the Czech Republic. It has about 700 inhabitants.

== Administrative division ==
Holčovice consists of six municipal parts (in brackets population according to the 2021 census):

- Holčovice (327)
- Dlouhá Ves (8)
- Hejnov (132)
- Jelení (33)
- Komora (63)
- Spálené (89)

== History ==
The first written mention of Holčovice is from 1377.

== Demographics ==
Historical population
Year	Pop.	±%
1869	5,751	—
1880	5,307	−7.7%
1890	4,941	−6.9%
1900	4,538	−8.2%
1910	4,199	−7.5%
1921	3,733	−11.1%
1930	3,683	−1.3%
1950	886	−75.9%
1961	1,130	+27.5%
1970	978	−13.5%
1980	856	−12.5%
1991	678	−20.8%
2001	746	+10.0%
2011	679	−9.0%
2021	652	−4.0%
Source: Censuses
