= Karlovice (Bruntál District) =

- Municipality
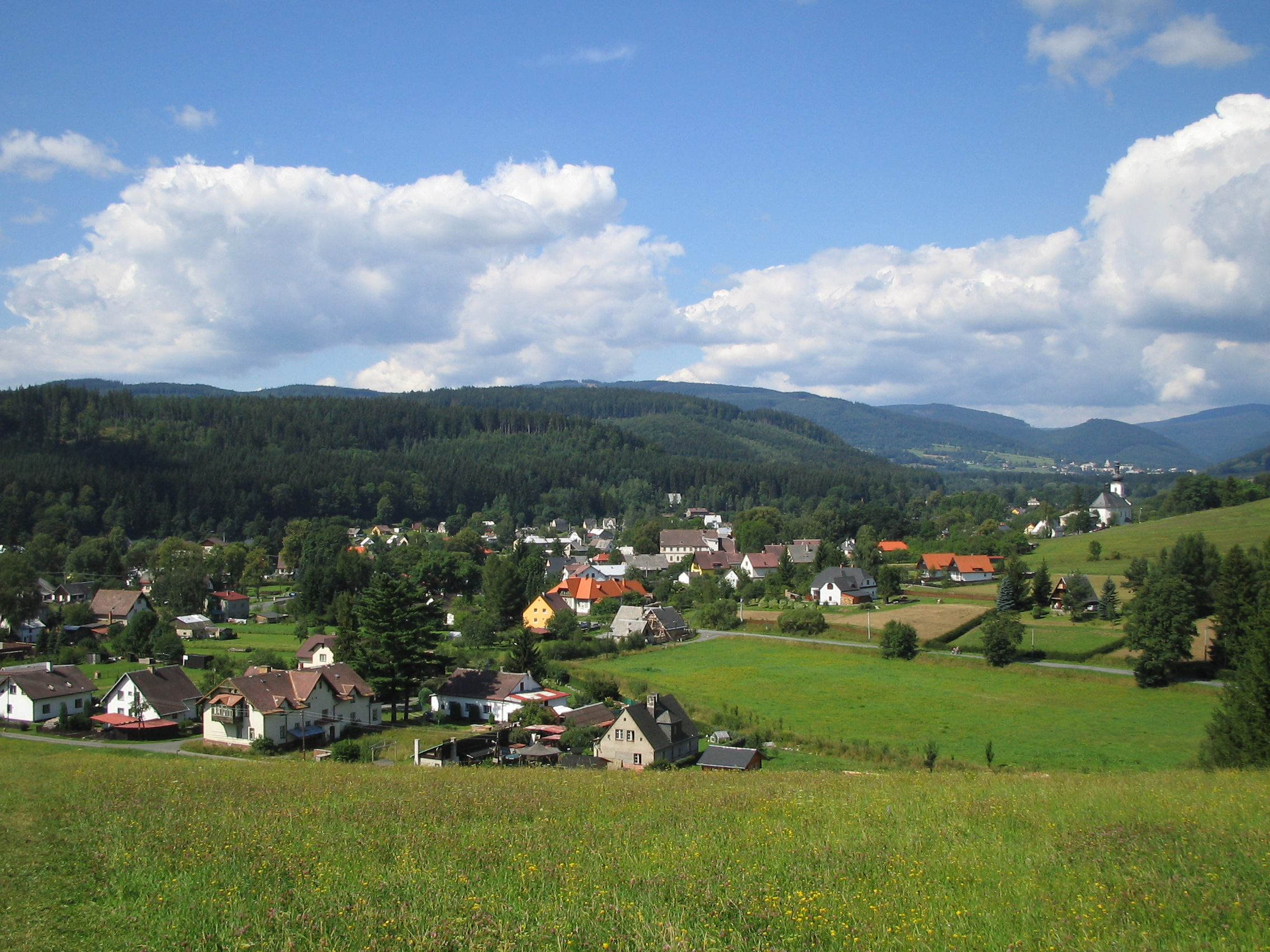
- View of Karlovice

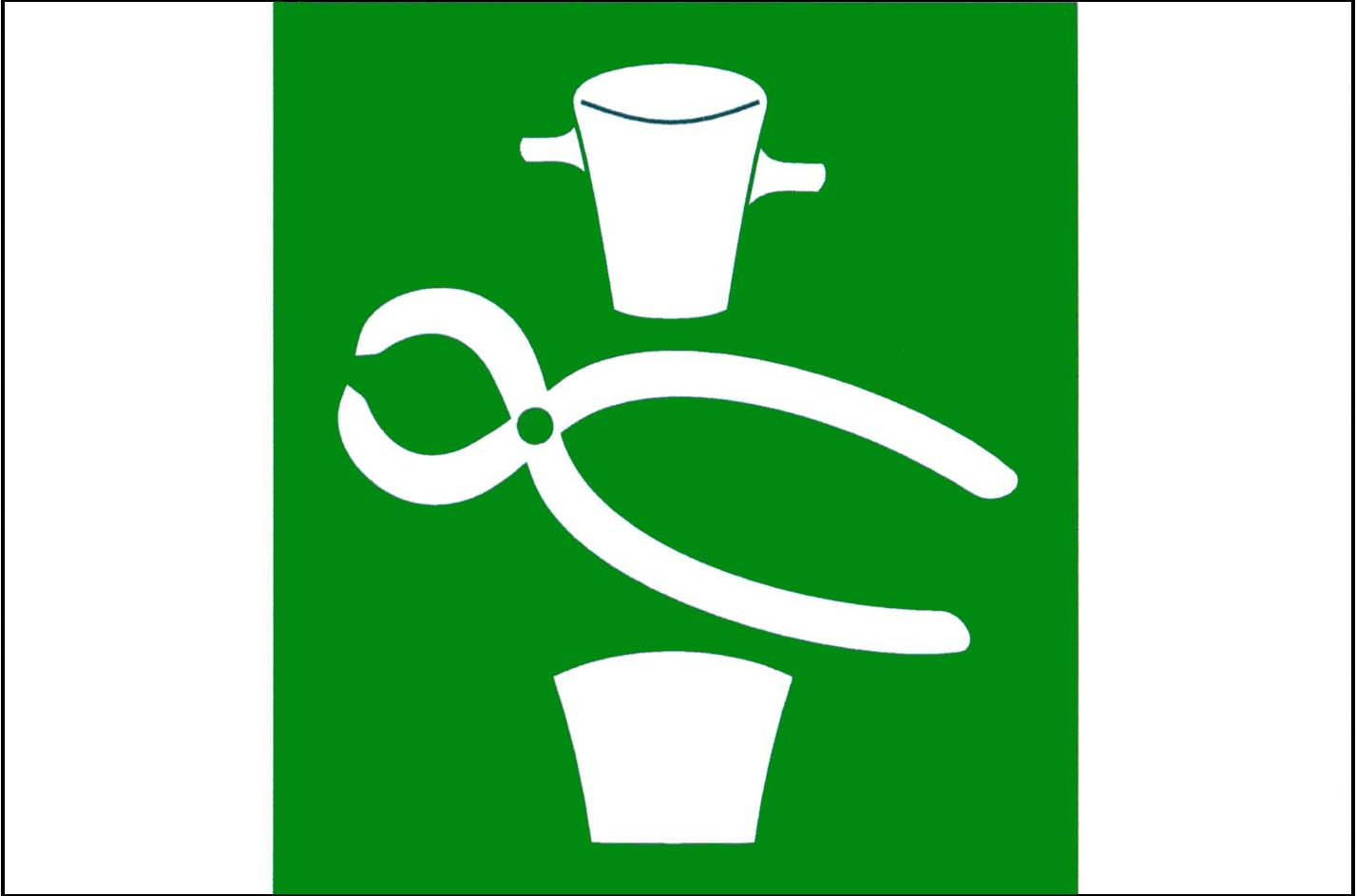
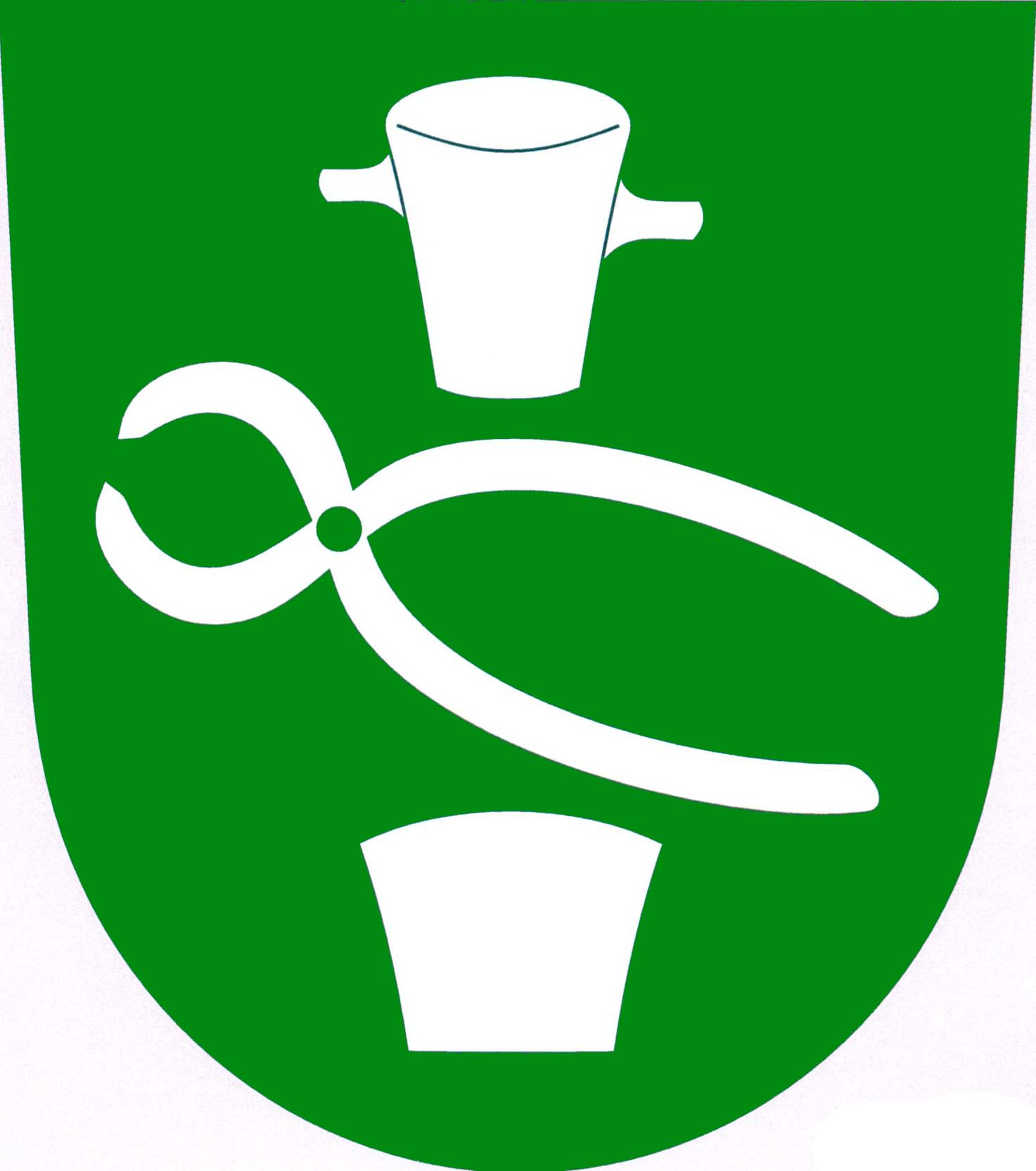
- Flag Coat of arms

- Location in the Czech Republic
- Coordinates: 50°6′20″N 17°26′45″E
- Country: Czech Republic
- Region: Moravian-Silesian
- District: Bruntál
- First mentioned: 1558

Area
  - Total: 21.63 km^{2} (8.35 sq mi)
- Elevation: 480 m (1,570 ft)

Population (2026-01-01)
  - Total: 963
  - Density: 44.5/km^{2} (115/sq mi)
- Time zone: UTC+1 (CET)
  - Summer (DST): UTC+2 (CEST)
- Postal code: 793 26
- Website: www.karlovice.eu

Karlovice (German: Karlsthal) is a municipality and village in Bruntál District in the Moravian-Silesian Region of the Czech Republic. It has about 1,000 inhabitants.

== Administrative division ==
Karlovice consists of two municipal parts (in brackets population according to the 2021 census):

- Karlovice (843)
- Zadní Ves (128)

== Geography ==
Karlovice is located about 13 kilometres (8 mi) north of Bruntál and 64 km (40 mi) northeast of Ostrava. It lies on the border between three mountain ranges: Zlatohorská Highlands, Nízký Jeseník and Hrubý Jeseník. Most of the municipal territory lies in the Zlatohorská Highlands. The highest point is near the top of the mountain Větrník at 842 m (2,762 ft) above sea level. The built-up area lies in the valley of the Opava River.

== History ==
The first written mention of Karlovice is from 1558, then called Hütten. The village was destroyed during the Thirty Years' War and renewed in the 18th century.

During World War II, the German occupiers operated the E733 forced labour subcamp of the Stalag VIII-B/344 prisoner-of-war camp in the village.

== Demographics ==
Historical population

Year	Pop.	±%
1869	2,616	—
1880	2,595	−0.8%
1890	2,491	−4.0%
1900	2,214	−11.1%
1910	2,151	−2.8%

Year	Pop.	±%
1921	2,026	−5.8%
1930	2,186	+7.9%
1950	1,062	−51.4%
1961	1,270	+19.6%
1970	1,152	−9.3%

Year	Pop.	±%
1980	1,037	−10.0%
1991	1,062	+2.4%
2001	1,148	+8.1%
2011	1,030	−10.3%
2021	971	−5.7%

Source: Censuses

== Transport ==
Karlovice is located on the railway line Vrbno pod Pradědem–Milotice nad Opavou.

== Sights ==
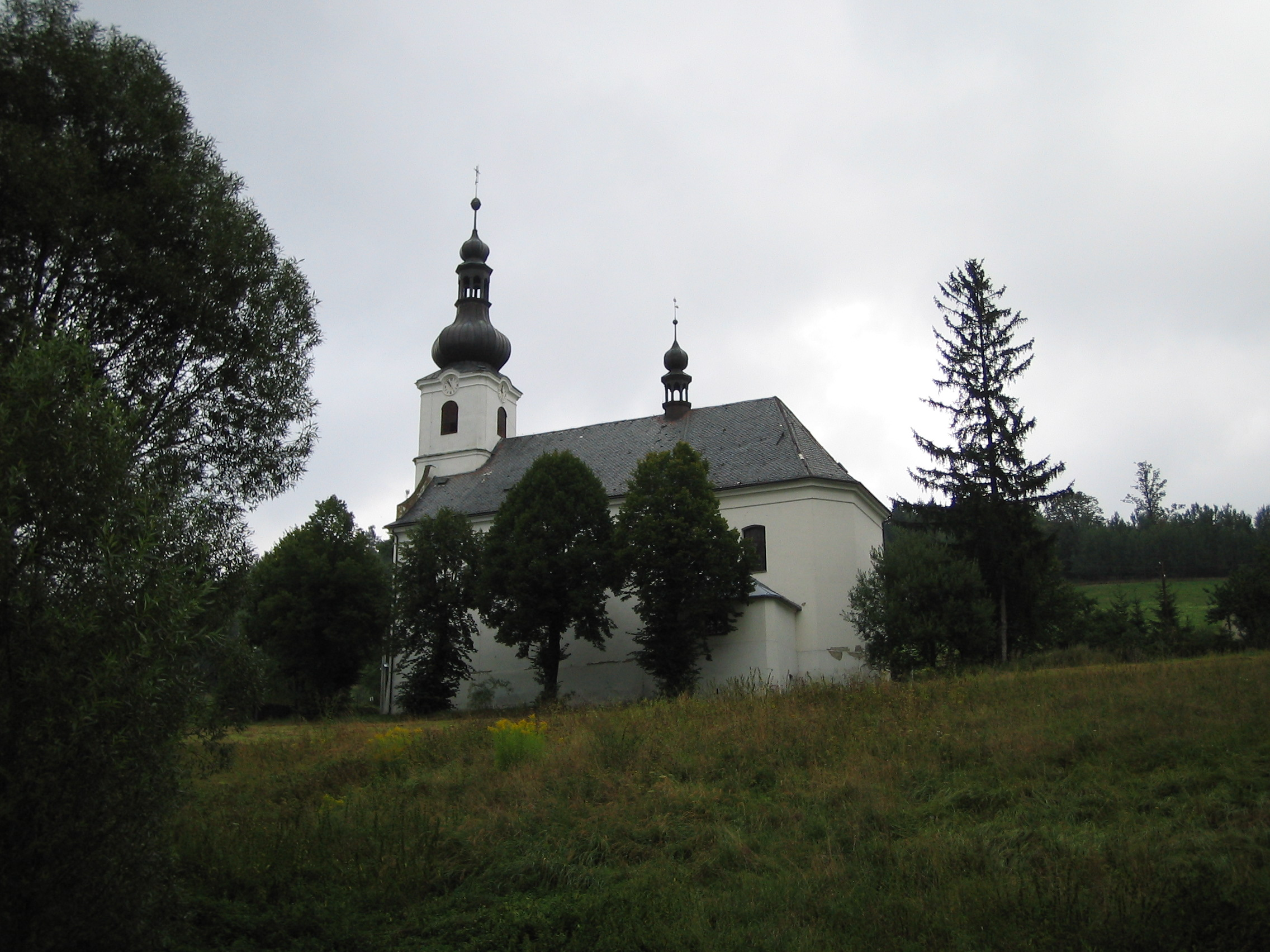
Church of Saint John of Nepomuk

The main landmark of Karlovice is the Church of Saint John of Nepomuk. It was built in the late Baroque style in 1777–1779.

An important technical monument is the local former scythe manufactory. It is a timbered two-storey house dating from around 1600, modified to its present form in 1759. Today it houses a local museum that focuses primarily on forestry. The building is protected as a national cultural monument.
