= Hradečná =

Mountain in the Czech Republic

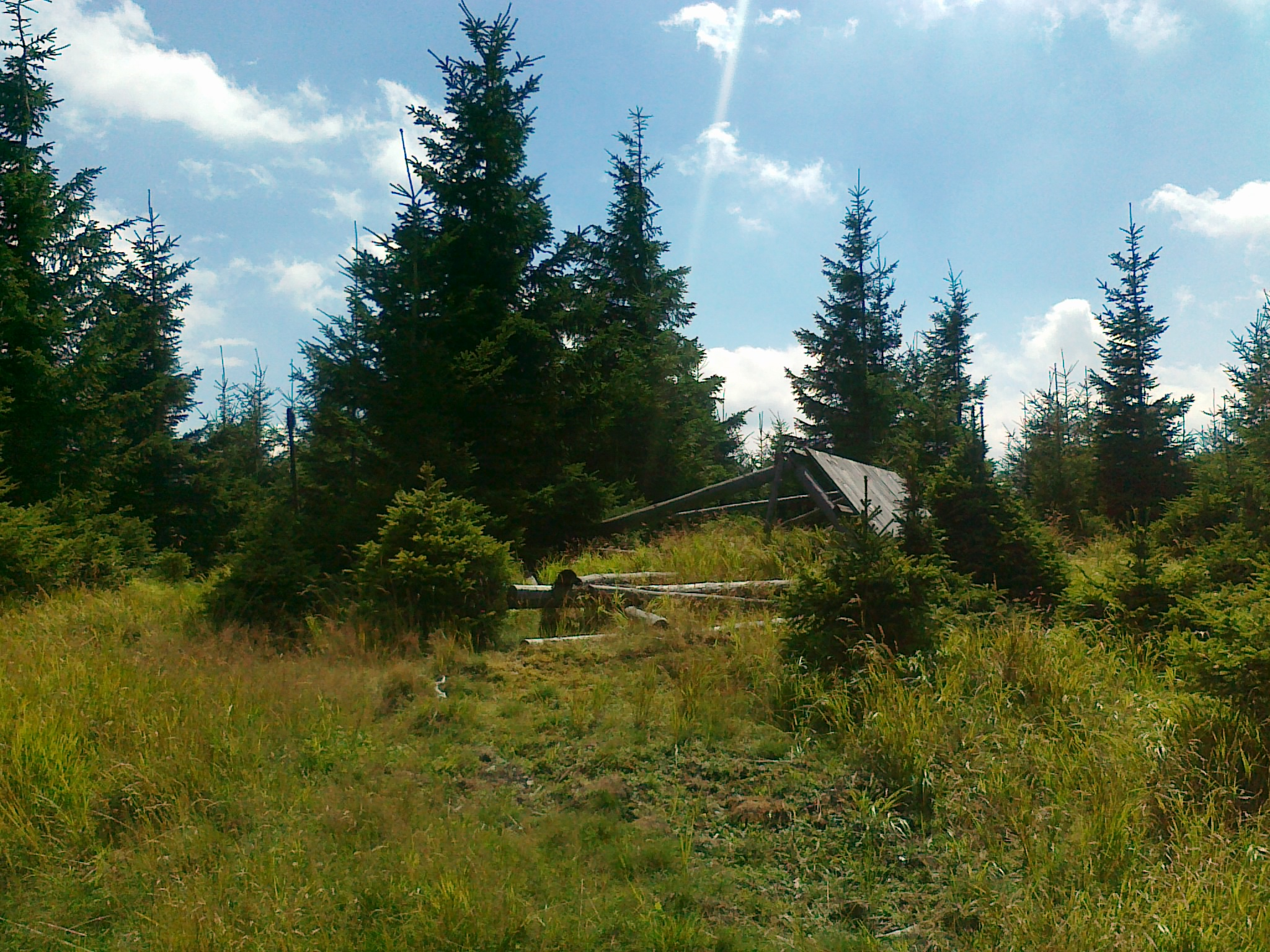
- View of the top of the Hradečná mountain

Highest point
- Elevation: 1,057 m (3,468 ft)
- Prominence: 39 m (128 ft)
- Coordinates: 50°4′7″N 17°17′26″E

Geography
- Location within Czech Republic
- Location: Malá Morávka
- Parent range: Hrubý Jeseník

Hradečná (German: Gritz Berg) is a mountain in the Hrubý Jeseník mountain range in the Czech Republic. It has an elevation of 1,057 m (3,468 ft) above sea level. It is located in the municipality of Malá Morávka. The mountain is situated on a side branch of the main ridge of the Praděd Mountains, near the spa town of Karlova Studánka.

== Description ==
=== Location ===
Hradečná is situated slightly east of the center of the entire Hrubý Jeseník range, within the geomorphological microregion of Praděd Mountains. It lies on a side branch of the main ridge of the Praděd Mountains. The summit area has a domed shape, which, from an aerial perspective, looks like a "bump" extending from the slope of Vysoká hole mountain, stretching to the nearby Hvězda Pass. The mountain is located near the spa town of Karlova Studánka, at the junction of tourist trails starting from Hvězda Pass. It is a well-recognizable mountain, visible from Karlova Studánka. The first section of the narrow, highly popular asphalt road called Ovčárenská silnice runs along its slope for about 1.4 km, leading from Hvězda Pass to Praděd mountain. Due to its narrowness, traffic on this road is controlled by a raised barrier and traffic lights. Additionally, roads No. 450 (from Bělá pod Pradědem to Bruntál) and No. 445 (from Rýmařov to Zlaté Hory) pass through its slopes. The mountain is not visible from the road surrounding the summit area of Praděd because it is obscured by the slope of Vysoká hole, nor from another characteristic viewpoint – the road encircling the summit of Dlouhé stráně – as it is also hidden by Petrovy kameny mountain.

The mountain is bounded by:

- to the west, a pass at 1,018 m above sea level towards the summit of Vysoká hole;
- to the northeast, the valley of the Bílá Opava stream;
- to the east, Hvězda Pass;
- to the southeast, a pass at 830 m above sea level towards the U pecí summit.

Surrounding peaks include:

- to the west, Petrovy kameny;
- to the northwest, Praděd–V and Ostrý vrch;
- to the north, Lyra–J;
- to the northeast, Skalnatý vrch;
- to the east, Hřeben–Z;
- to the southeast, Prostřední skála, Prostřední skála–JZ, U pecí, and Javorový vrch (2)–JV;
- to the southwest, Kopřivná, Kopřivná–SZ, Temná, and Vysoká hole.

=== Slopes ===
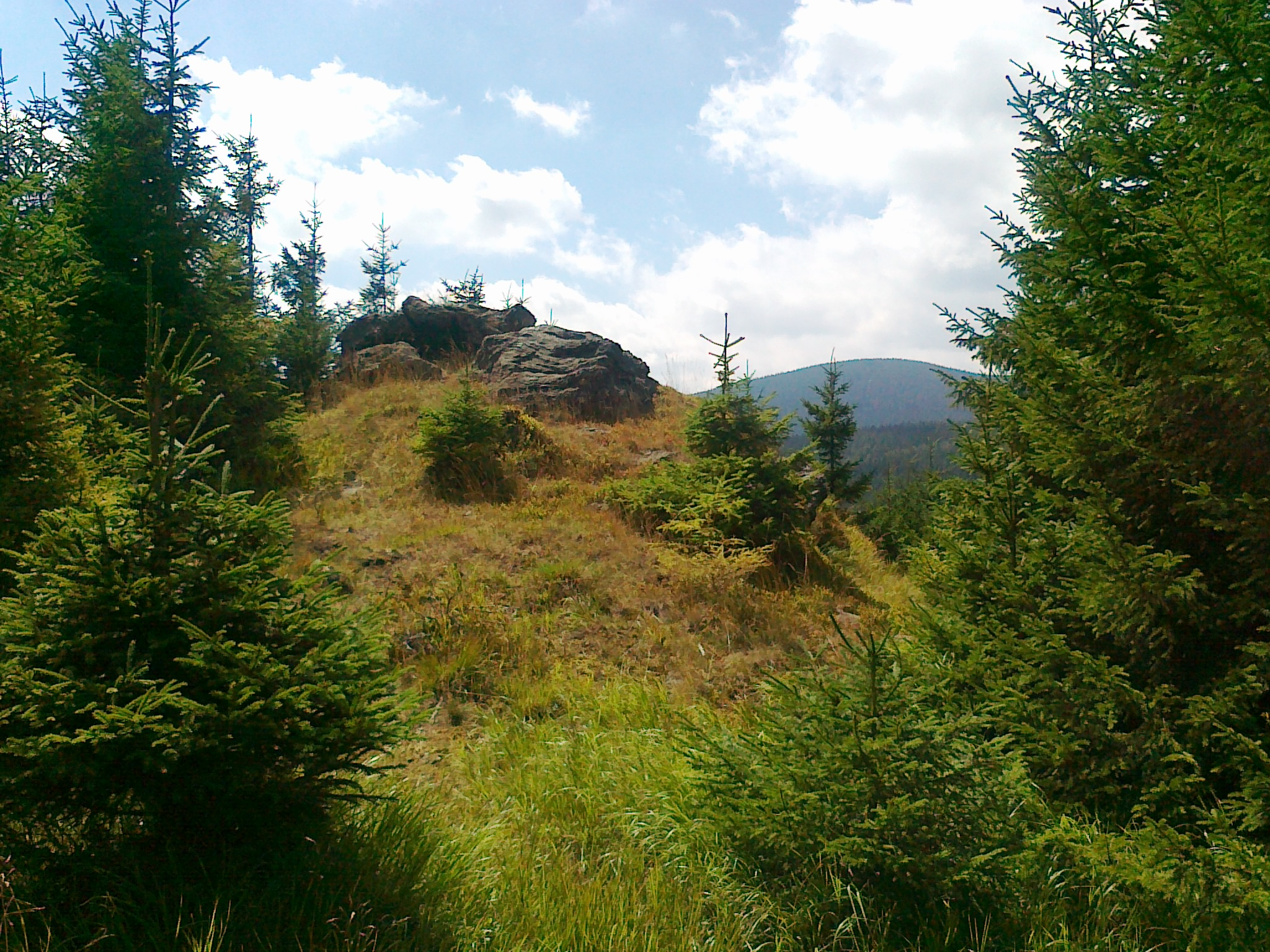
View of the rocky outcrop near the summit of Hradečná (approximately 50 m away) and Temná mountain

Within Hradečná, five main slopes can be distinguished:

- western;
- northeastern;
- eastern, known as U Hvězdy;
- southeastern;
- southern;

All types of forestation can be found here: spruce forest, mixed forest, (Note: The forest stand of the entire Jeseníky Protected Landscape Area includes: European spruce 84%, European beech 10%, European larch 1.5%, sycamore maple 1.1%, birch 1%, common alder 0.8%, dwarf mountain pine 0.4%, grey alder 0.3%, (European silver fir, European ash, and linden) 0.2%, Scotch pine 0.1%, and others (Pinus mugo, oak, hornbeam, Norway maple, elm, rowan, green alder, aspen, poplar, and goat willow) 0.2%.) and deciduous forest, with dense spruce forest being predominant. On the northeastern and southeastern slopes, in addition to the spruce forest, there are areas covered with mixed forest, and on the northeastern slope, as the elevation decreases, there are even areas covered with deciduous forest. Additionally, at the foot of the northeastern slope, near the buildings of the village Karlova Studánka, there are meadows. The slopes are characterized by relatively uniform and stable forestation with clearings, a few glades, and a significant several hundred-meter-long triangular deforestation on the eastern slope at an altitude of about 900 m above sea level, near Hvězda Pass. At the foot of the northeastern and eastern slopes, there is an overhead power line with a voltage of 22 kV. To the southwest of the summit (western slope), about 50 m away, there is a solitary rocky outcrop, which serves as a scenic viewpoint. From there, one can see, among other things, the summit of Temná and the slope of Vysoká hole mountain with the so-called Stone Sea named Suť. Slightly lower on this slope, at distances of about 250 m and 260 m from the summit, there are two other rock outcrops. Additionally, on the southern and southeastern slopes, there are areas of boulder fields. The slopes lack groups of rocks.

The slopes have relatively uniform, generally gentle, and varied inclinations. The average slope inclination ranges from 7° (western slope) to 14° (northeastern slope). The average inclination of all the slopes of the mountain (weighted arithmetic mean inclination) is about 11°. The maximum average inclination of the northeastern slope at an altitude of about 970 m above sea level, near the Ovčárenská silnice road, does not exceed 30° over a 50-meter section. The slopes are covered with a network of roads (e.g., Kapitánská cesta and Ovčárenská silnice) and generally unmarked paths and tracks.

=== Summit ===
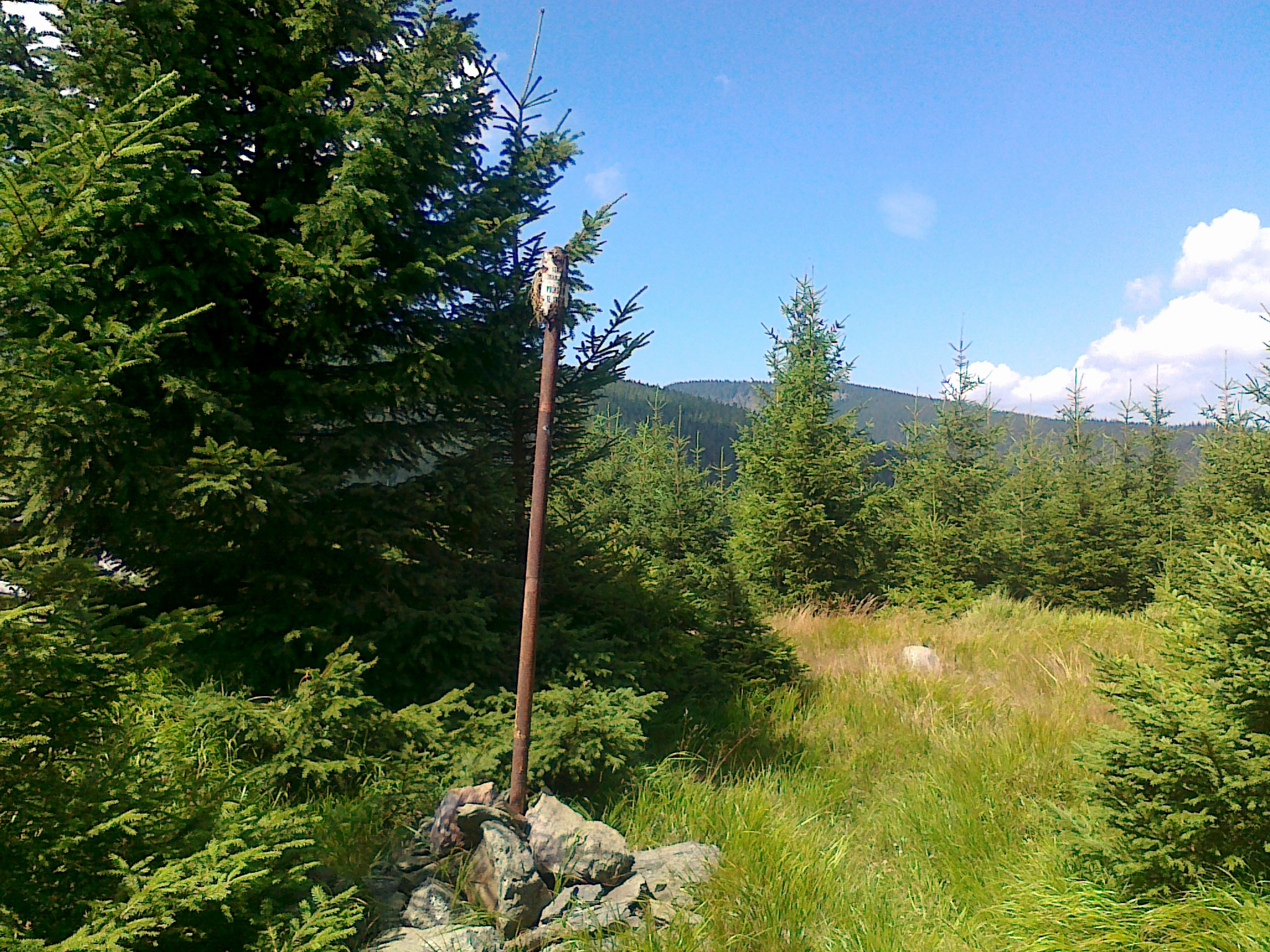
Triangulation station on the summit of Hradečná, with Ostrý vrch mountain visible in the distance

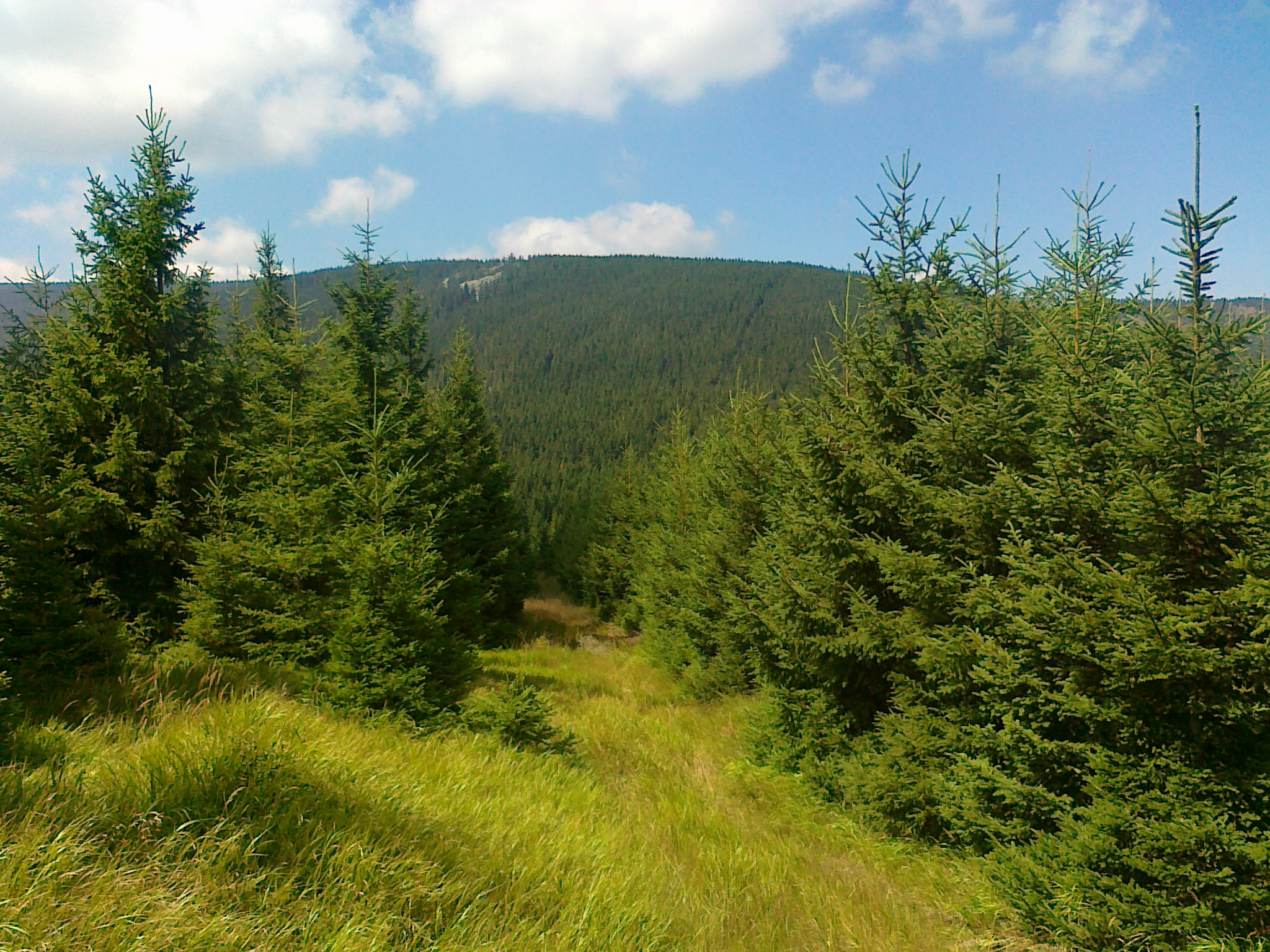
View from the summit of Hradečná towards the slope of Vysoká hole mountain with the so-called Stone Sea (Suť)

No tourist trail leads to the summit. Hradečná has a single peak. A main path runs almost in a straight line from Hvězda Pass to the pass towards the summit of Vysoká hole. The summit area features a small meadow amidst dense spruce forest, covered with alpine grass. Due to the forestation, it offers a limited viewpoint. There are remnants of a former observation gazebo on the summit, consisting of beams and a roof. A triangulation station, marked on maps as number 30, is located on the summit at an altitude of 1,056.56 m above sea level, with geographical coordinates 50°04′07.17″N 17°17′25.85″E. Near the station is a steel post warning against its destruction, marked with a plaque stating Státní triangulace Poškození se trestá, (Note: English: State triangulation network. Damage is subject to punishment.) located about 4 m southeast of the summit. The Czech Office for Surveying, Mapping, and Cadastre (ČÚZK) in Prague indicates the highest point of the mountain – the summit – as 1,056.8 m above sea level with geographical coordinates 50°04′07.2″N 17°17′25.7″E.

Access to the summit is possible in two ways:

- a forest path running straight for about 1 km, starting behind a booth (porter’s lodge) by the barrier on the Ovčárenská silnice road at Hvězda Pass;
- from the Ovčárenská silnice road, after covering a distance of about 1.5 km from Hvězda Pass, a left turn at the barrier onto another asphalt road called Půlnoční cesta, followed for about 360 m, then turning left onto an unmarked path that leads to the summit area after about 380 m.

=== Geology ===
Geologically, the massif of Hradečná belongs to a unit known as the Vbrno layers and is composed of metamorphic rocks, mainly phyllites (biotite, muscovite, chlorite), schists (graphite), greenschist, and igneous rocks, primarily meta-diabase. The shape of the mountain and the presence of diabase suggest its volcanic origin.

=== Waters ===
The summit and slopes of Hradečná belongs to the Baltic Sea basin, with waters flowing into the Oder river, fed by mountain streams from this part of the Hrubý Jeseník. These streams include those flowing near the mountain, such as Bílá Opava and Bělokamenný potok. Several short, unnamed streams originate from the northeastern and southern slopes, feeding into the aforementioned streams Bílá Opava and Bělokamenný potok. About 770 m northeast of the summit (northeastern slope) at an altitude of 831 m above sea level, near road No. 450, there is a spring marked as Studánka bez jména. Additionally, at the foot of the northeastern slope, in the village of Karlova Studánka, near road No. 445, there are two fountains. Due to the relatively gentle slopes, there are no waterfalls or cascades on the mountain.

== Nature preservation ==
The entire mountain is within the designated protected area called the Jeseníky Protected Landscape Area. This area was established to protect rock formations, soil, plants, and rare animal species. There are no nature reserves or other monuments named as nature monuments on its slopes.

At the foot of the northeastern slope begins an educational trail NS Bílá Opava about 5.5 km long, running along a route with a 550 m elevation gain:

Karlova Studánka (Hubert) – Hradečná – Bílá Opava stream valley – Ostrý vrch – Praděd–V – Praděd – Barborka mountain hut – U Barborky (with 6 observation points)

== Tourism ==
=== Tourist trails ===
The Czech Tourist Club has marked four tourist trails in the area around the mountain, with small sections at the northeastern foot of the slope on the following routes:

Karlova Studánka (Hubert) – Hradečná – Hvězda Pass – Kopřivový vrch – Železný vrch – Malá Morávka

Karlova Studánka – Hradečná – Bílá Opava stream valley – Ostrý vrch – Barborka mountain hut – U Barborky Pass – Petrovy kameny – Ovčárna – Vysoká hole – Velká kotlina – Moravice river valley – Karlov pod Pradědem – Malá Morávka

Kouty nad Desnou – Hřbety – Nad Petrovkou – Kamzík – Velký Jezerník – Velký Jezerník Pass – Švýcárna mountain hut – Praděd – U Barborky Pass – Petrovy kameny – Ovčárna – Hradečná – Karlova Studánka

Karlova Studánka – Hradečná – Bílá Opava stream valley – Ostrý vrch – Bílá Opava waterfalls – Petrovy kameny – Ovčárna – Vysoká hole – Temná – Kopřivná – Karlov pod Pradědem – Malá Morávka

Additionally, two walking trails have been marked in the area:

Karlova Studánka – Hvězda Pass – Hradečná – Karlova Studánka

Karlova Studánka

=== Cycling trails ===
Three cycling routes pass through the slopes of Hradečná on the following routes:

Route No. 6029: Bruntál – Rudná pod Pradědem – Světlá Hora – Hvězda Pass – Hradečná – Karlova Studánka – Kóta Pass – Vidly – Vrbno pod Pradědem

Route No. 553: Rýmařov – Harrachovský kopec – Dolní Moravice – Malá Morávka – Hradečná – Hvězda Pass – Karlova Studánka – Vrbno pod Pradědem – Drakov

Hvězda Pass – Hradečná – Ovčárna – Petrovy kameny – U Barborky Pass – Praděd – Švýcárna mountain hut – Velký Jezerník Pass – Velký Jezerník – Kamzík – Výrovka – Velký Klínovec – Červenohorské sedlo

==== Road climbs ====
The cycling routes on the slopes of Hradečná also include sections of four road climbs popular with cyclists on the following routes:

Road climbs
Number	Route	Designation	Length (kilometres)	Elevation gain (meters)	Average gradient (%)	Number of road loops
1	Hvězda Pass – Praděd summit		9.1	632	6.9	0
2	Hvězda Pass – Kóta Pass	450	4.0	143	3.6	1
3	Rýmařov – Hvězda Pass	445	16.6	265	1.6	0
4	Vrbno pod Pradědem – Hvězda Pass	445	8.9	308	3.5	0

=== Ski trails ===
During snow periods, three cross-country skiing trails are available on the slopes of the mountain:

Hvězda Pass – Hradečná – Vysoká hole – Temná – Jelení cesta

Hvězda Pass – Hradečná – Vysoká hole – Temná – Kopřivná – Karlov pod Pradědem – Malá Morávka

Karlova Studánka – Skalnatý vrch – Lyra – Žárový vrch – Plošina – Zámecká hora – Vrbno pod Pradědem

There are no downhill skiing routes in the area of the mountain.

== Bibliography ==
- Skuhravá, L.; Kočí, K. (2012). Karlova Studánka (in Czech) (1 ed.). Karlová Studánka: Obec Karlova Studánka. ISBN 978-80-260-3245-8. OCLC 829661053. Archived from the original on 2020-03-23.
