= Lyra (mountain) =

Mountain in the Czech Republic

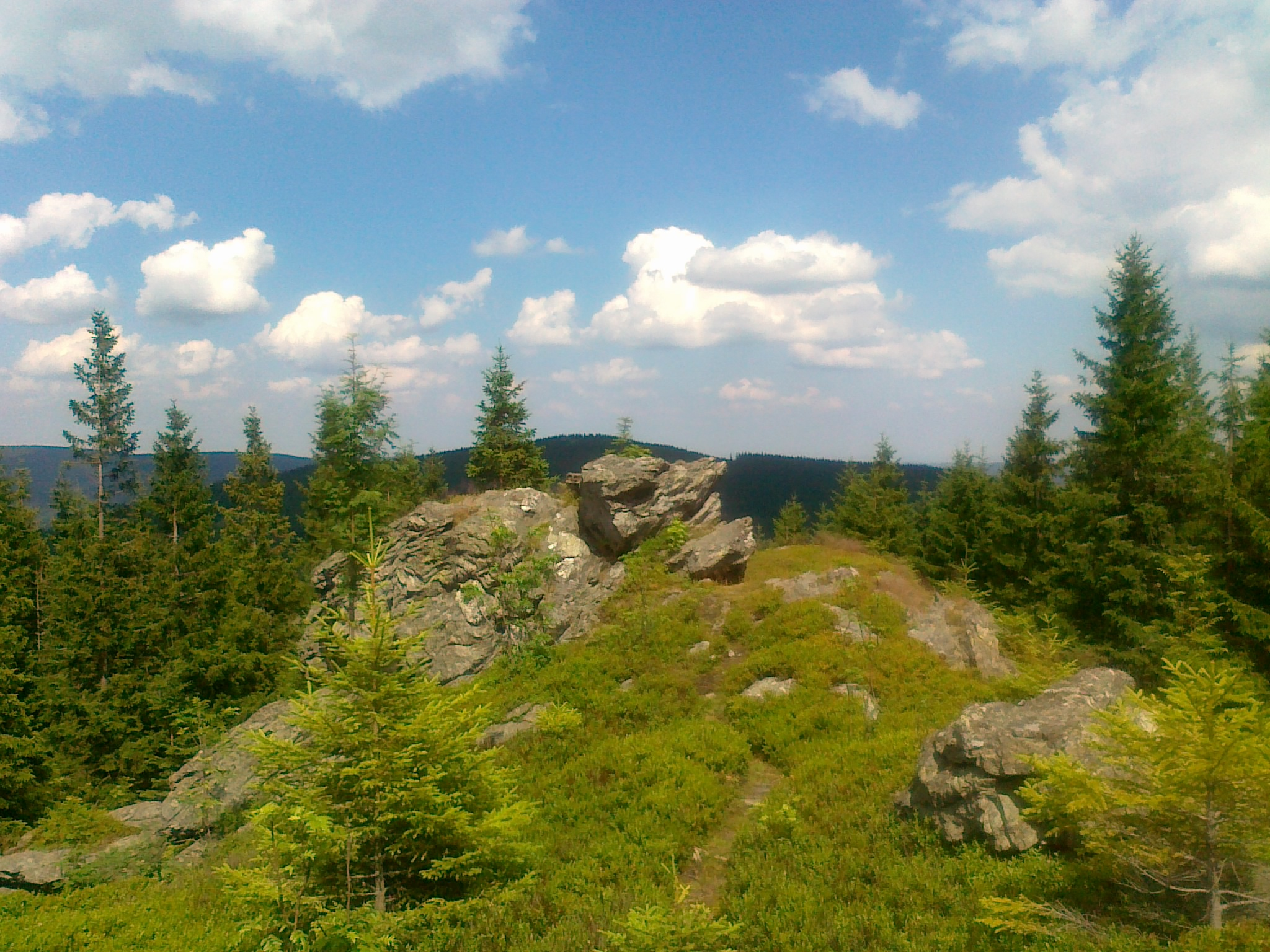
- View of the summit rocky outcrop of Lyra (with the peak of Žárový vrch in the distance above)

Highest point
- Elevation: 1,099 m (3,606 ft)
- Prominence: 100 m (330 ft)
- Isolation: 1.7 km (1.1 mi)
- Coordinates: 50°5′50″N 17°17′29″E

Geography
- Location within Czech Republic
- Location: Ludvíkov
- Parent range: Hrubý Jeseník

Lyra (German: Leier Berg) is a mountain in the Hrubý Jeseník mountain range in the Czech Republic. It has an elevation of 1,099 m (3,606 ft) above sea level. It is located in the municipality of Ludvíkov. It is characterized by a rock formation.

== Characteristics ==
=== Location ===
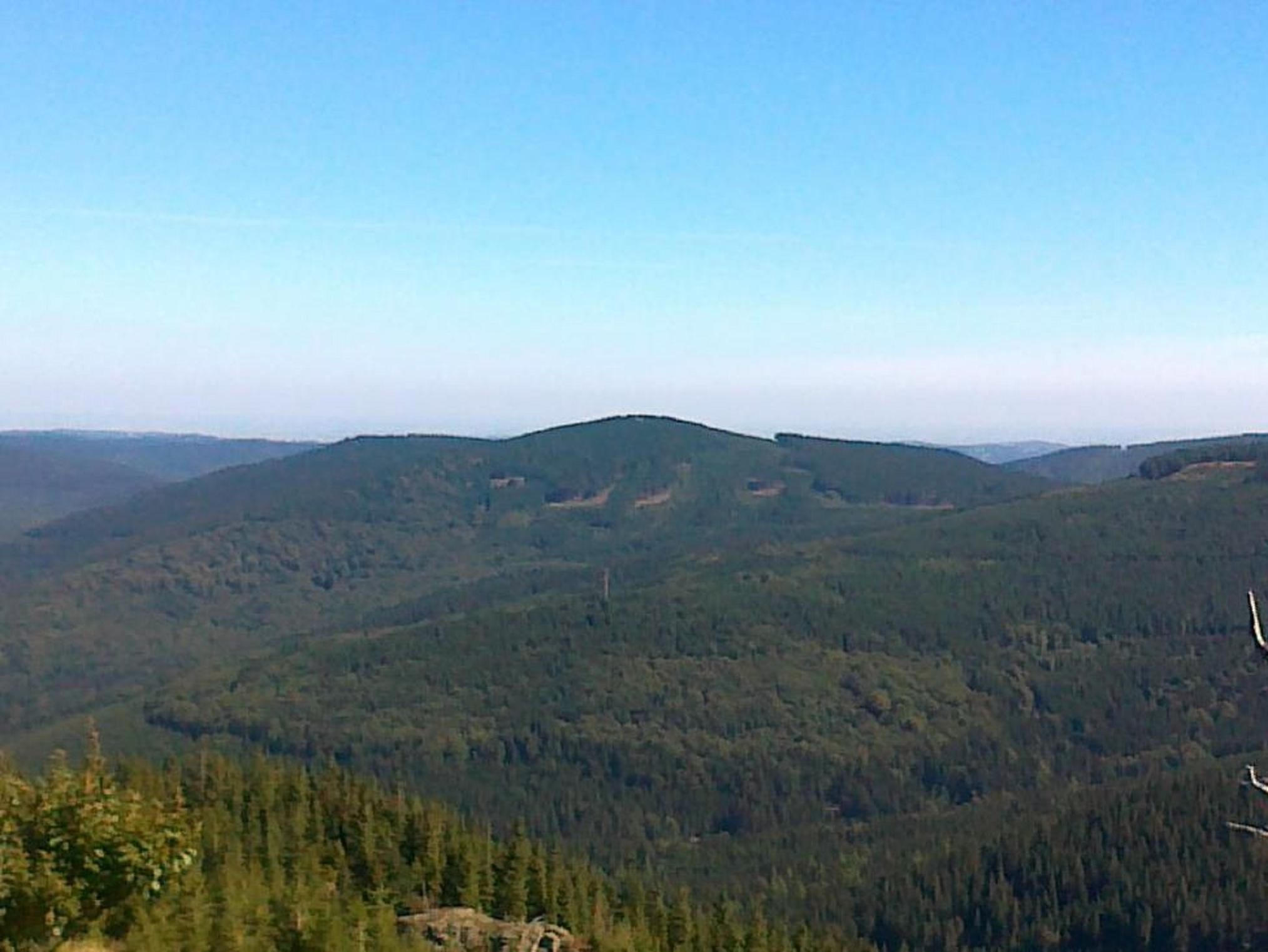
View from the summit of Sokol mountain towards Žárový vrch (with Bučina and Lyra faintly visible below, and behind them part of Vysoká hora)

Lyra is a mountain located slightly east of the centre of the Hrubý Jeseník range, in the western area known as the Medvědí Mountains. The mountain is not easily recognizable and has an unremarkable profile, with a flat summit ridge about 600 metres long running north to south. It is part of a massif that includes the mountains Lyra, Žárový vrch, and Plošina, all of which have elevations above 1,000 metres. Lyra lies on a side ridge of the Medvědí Mountains that extends from Kóta pass to Zámecká hora mountain. The summit is located about 3 kilometres northwest of Karlova Studánka and near road no. 450, which runs between Bělá pod Pradědem and Bruntál, passing through Kóta pass.

The mountain is visible from the road leading to the summit of Praděd, where it can be seen below the line of sight towards Vysoká hora and above the summit of Prostřední vrch. However, from the road around the summit of Dlouhé stráně, it is obscured by Praděd. It is also clearly visible from the summit area of the neighboring mountain Sokol.

The mountain is bordered by:

- Kóta pass to the southwest;
- the Videlský potok valley to the west;
- a 954-metre-high pass towards Bučina to the northwest;
- the Střední Opava valley and its tributary streams to the north;
- a 951-metre-high pass towards Žárový vrch to the northeast;
- tributary streams of Bílá Opava to the east;
- the Bílá Opava valley and a 901-metre-high pass towards Skalnatý vrch to the southeast.

Nearby peaks include:

- Žárový vrch–SV and Žárový vrch–JZ to the northeast;
- Na Vyhlídce to the east;
- Ovčí vrch, Rolandův kámen, and Skalnatý vrch to the southeast;
- Hradečná to the south;
- Prostřední vrch and Ostrý vrch to the southwest;
- Sokol and Sokolí skála to the west;
- Bučina to the northwest.

=== Slopes ===
Lyra features seven main slopes:

- northern
- northeastern
- eastern (called Letiště)
- southeastern (called Na Svachu)
- southern
- western
- northwestern

All types of forestation can be found here: spruce forest, mixed forest, (Note: The forest stand of the entire Jeseníky Protected Landscape Area includes: European spruce 84%, European beech 10%, European larch 1.5%, sycamore maple 1.1%, birch 1%, common alder 0.8%, dwarf mountain pine 0.4%, grey alder 0.3%, (European silver fir, European ash, and linden) 0.2%, Scotch pine 0.1%, and others (Pinus mugo, oak, hornbeam, Norway maple, elm, rowan, green alder, aspen, poplar, and goat willow) 0.2%.) and deciduous forest, with spruce forest being the predominant type. The northeastern and southern slopes are mainly covered with spruce forest, while the other slopes, in addition to spruce forest, are also covered with mixed forest. On the northern, eastern, and northwestern slopes, there are areas of deciduous forest. Almost all of the slopes feature clearings, with the northern slope showing significant deforestation. At the foot of the southeastern slope, near road No. 445, there is an overhead power line with a voltage of 22 kV. Lyra (like the neighboring Žárový vrch) is dotted with individual rock formations (including Rolandův kámen) and a few small rock groups.

The slopes have relatively uneven, generally gentle, and varied inclines. The average slope gradient ranges from 7° (southern slope) to 14° (western slope). The average inclination of all slopes (weighted arithmetic mean of slope inclinations) is about 9°. The maximum average gradient on the eastern slope near a rock group, at an elevation of around 1,030 metres, does not exceed 30° over a 50-metre stretch. The slopes are covered with a network of numerous roads (including Hraniční cesta, Karlovostudánecká cesta, K Obůrce, Nekorancova trasa, Pytlácká cesta, Rolandova cesta, and Videlská cesta) as well as mostly unmarked paths and trails. Roads No. 450 and No. 445 from Zlaté Hory to Šternberk run through the southern and western slopes and the southeastern foothills, respectively.

==== Rolandův kámen ====
A notable rock formation called Rolandův kámen is located on the southeastern slope, about 2 kilometres southeast of Lyra's main summit, near the Rolandova cesta road. This formation, which stands at 936 metres, serves as a viewpoint accessible via a circular trail that leads to a wooden cross at the top. The formation is reachable from the Rolandova cesta road, which branches off from road no. 450 between Karlova Studánka and the Vidly settlement. There is a marked blue walking trail and an educational path (Naučná stezka Muzeum Wide Web) leading to this point.

=== Main summit ===
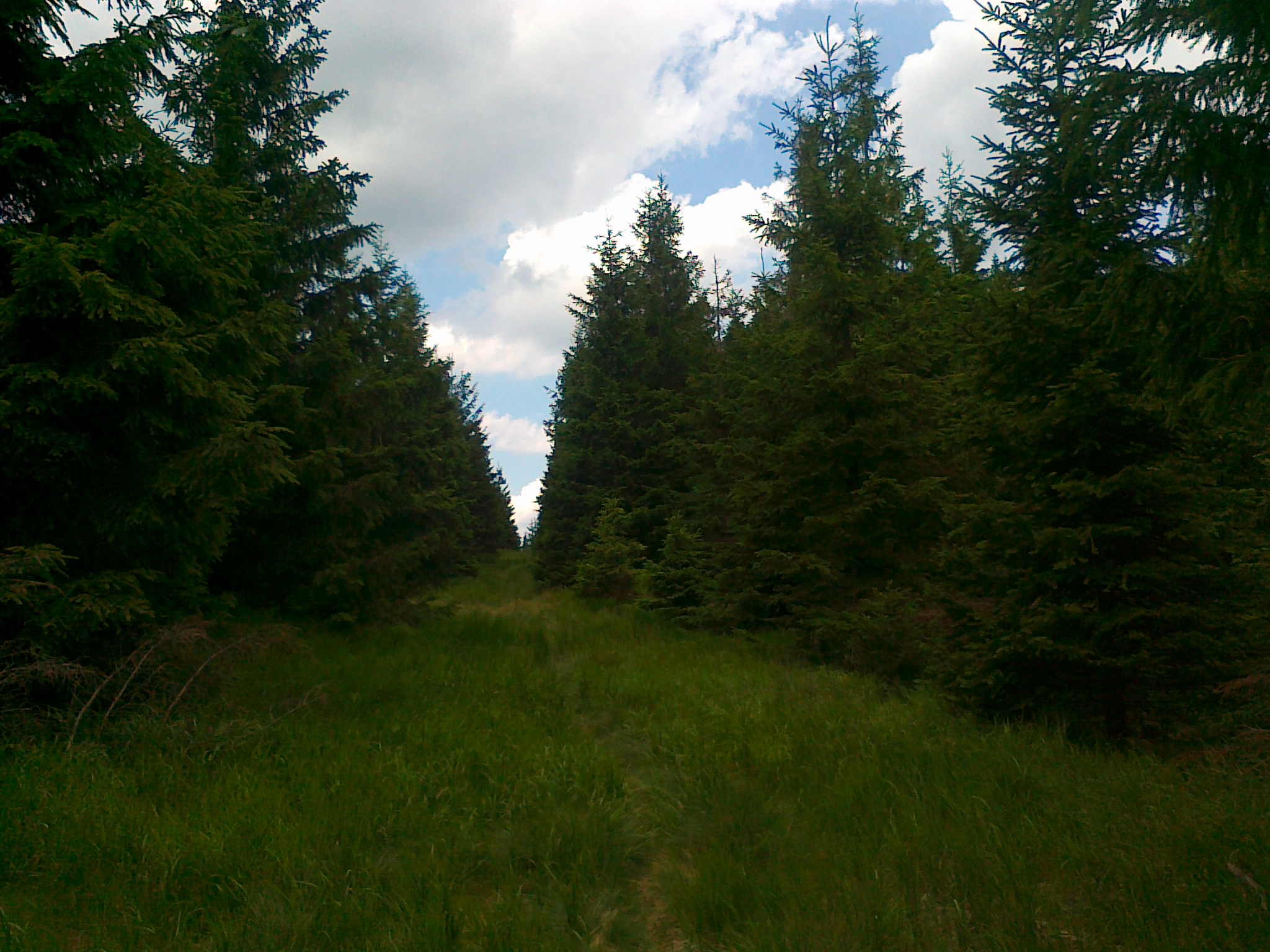
Main path on the ridge of Lyra

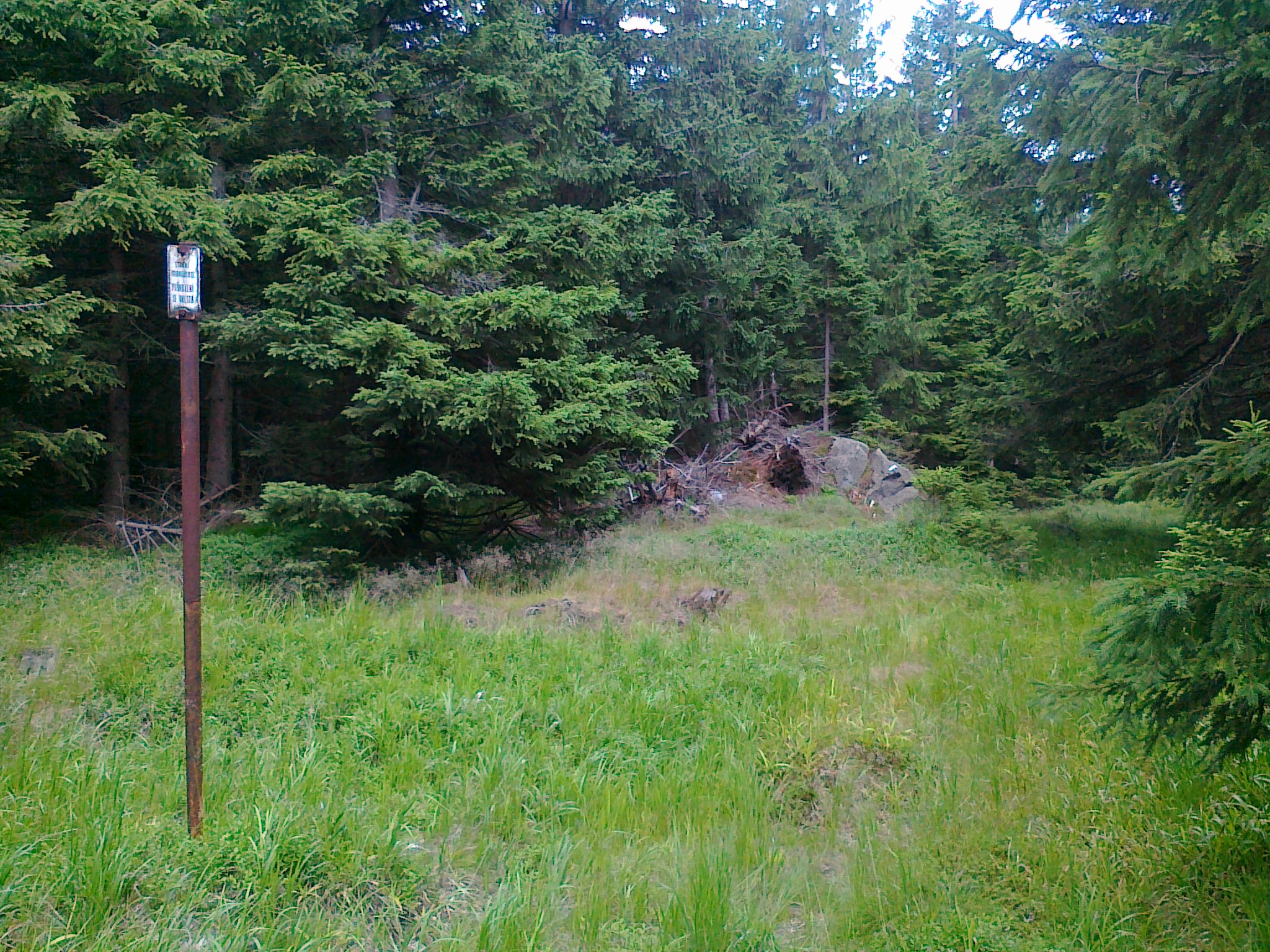
Triangulation station near the main path of Lyra

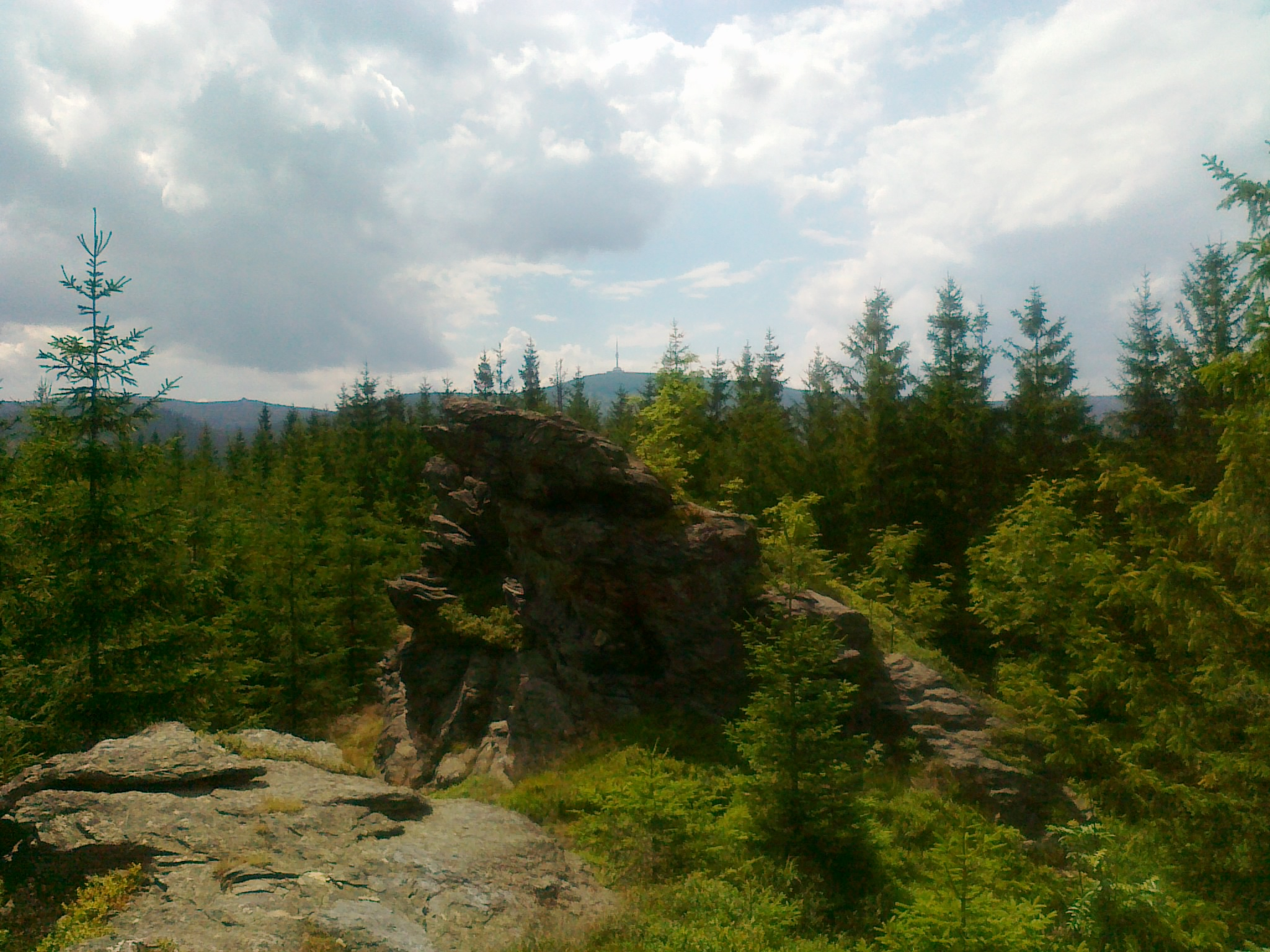
View from the rocky ourcrop of Lyra at the summit of: Vysoká hole, Petrovy kameny and Praděd

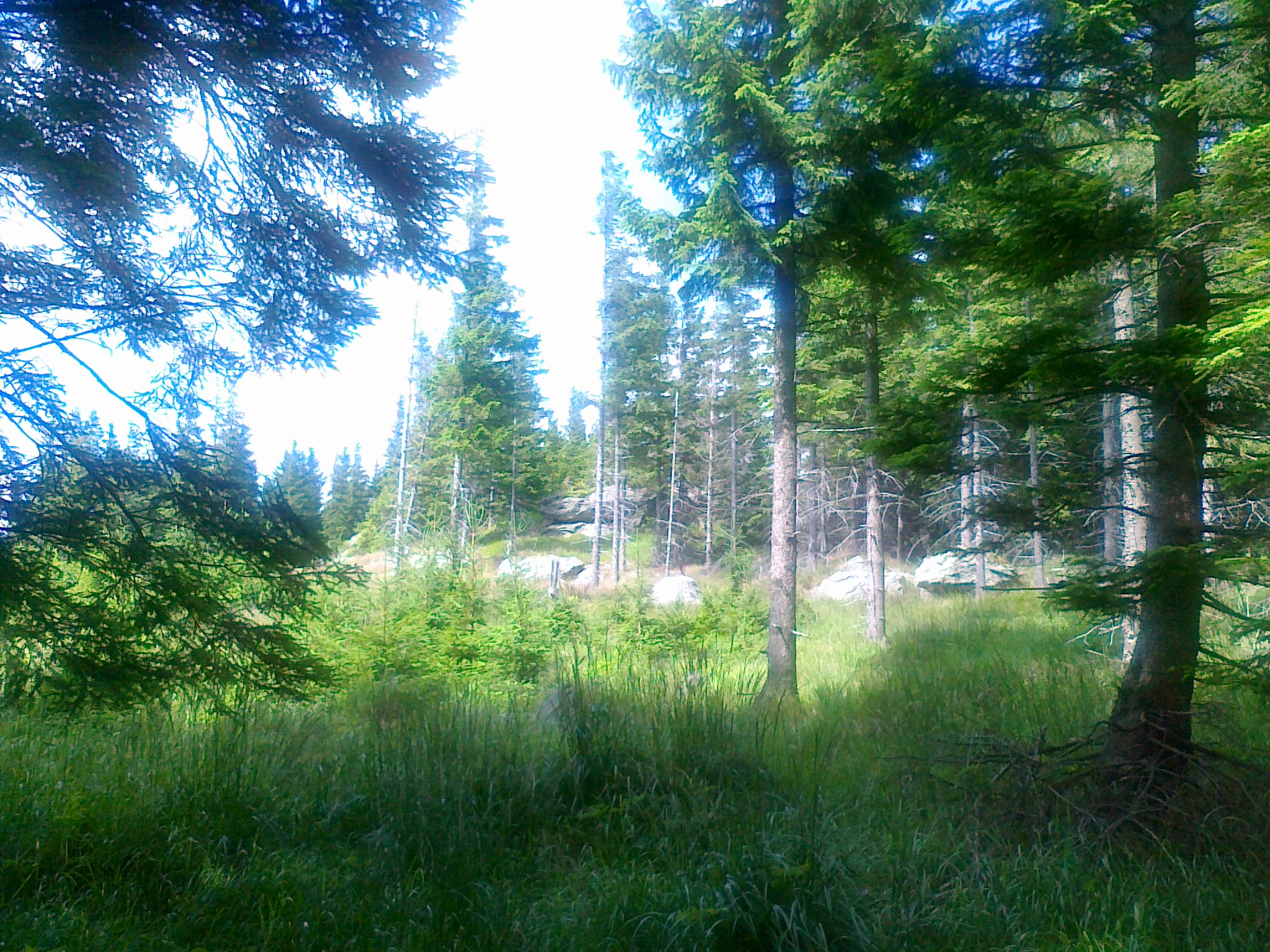
View at the Lyra–J rock formation

The main summit of Lyra has no marked tourist trail leading to it. However, a main path runs through the summit area, traversing a nearly flat ridge through a forest clearing. The summit itself is located on a rock formation about 125 metres long, surrounded by spruce forest and covered with a very common plant found throughout the Hrubý Jeseník area, namely European blueberry. The summit rock formation serves as a viewpoint offering vistas of mountains such as Praděd, Vysoká hole, Petrovy kameny, and Žárový vrch.

On the summit area, there is a triangulation station marked on maps with the number 19, at an elevation of 1,092.30 metres above sea level, with geographical coordinates of 50°05′47.45″N 17°17′29.64″E. Next to it stands a steel post warning against damage, with a plaque that reads Státní triangulace (English: State Triangulation – Damage is punishable). This point is located about 110 metres southwest of the summit. Some maps take the position of the main triangulation station or a nearby spot as the mountain's summit, which causes discrepancies in the location. The State Administration of Land Surveying and Cadastre lists the highest point of the summit at 1,098.6 metres above sea level, with geographical coordinates of 50°05′50.1″N 17°17′29.4″E.

=== Secondary summit ===
Approximately 650 metres south of the main summit lies a secondary summit known as Lyra-J, at an elevation of 1,097 metres above sea level, with geographical coordinates of 50°05′29.9″N 17°17′27.4″E. The two summits are separated by a minor pass at 1,084 metres above sea level. This secondary summit is also a rock formation, located within a spruce forest. Around 135 metres east of the summit rock formation lies another secondary triangulation station, marked on maps with the number 19.1, at an elevation of 1,083.51 metres above sea level, with coordinates of 50°05′30.54″N 17°17′34.18″E. Access to this summit rock formation is possible from a nearby path.

=== Geology ===
Geologically, the Lyra mountain massif belongs to the Desná Dome unit and is composed of metamorphic rocks, mainly blasto-mylonites, phyllites (biotite, chlorite, and muscovite), gneisses, quartzites, igneous rocks (mainly meta-granitoids), and sedimentary rocks, primarily meta-conglomerates and meta-siltstones.

=== Waters ===
The summits and slopes of Lyra are located northeast of the European watershed boundary, meaning they belong to the Baltic Sea drainage basin. The waters flow into the Baltic Sea via the Oder river basin, fed by mountain streams from this part of the Hrubý Jeseník range, including nearby streams such as Videlský Potok, Bílá Opava, and Střední Opava. Short, unnamed streams that originate on Lyra's slopes contribute to the aforementioned Bílá Opava and Střední Opava streams. Most of the sources of these streams are found in swampy areas. On the southeastern slope, near the settlement of Obůrka, there are two oval ponds, measuring approximately 15 and 25 metres in length, respectively. Due to the relatively gentle slopes of the mountain, there are no waterfalls or cascades in the area.

==== Springs ====
Three springs are found on Lyra's slopes:

Springs at the slopes of Lyra
Number	Spring name	Distance from summit (metres)	Elevation (metres above sea level)	Geographic coordinates
1	Pramen bez jména (10199)	1,430 m to the southeast	930	50°05′07″N 17°18′04″E
2	Studánka	1,030 m to the south	1,014	50°05′14″N 17°17′23″E
3	Studánka U Sedlové boudy (14185)	830 m to the northeast	955	50°06′05″N 17°18′00″E

== Nature preservation ==
The entire mountain is located within the Jeseníky Protected Landscape Area, established to protect geological formations, natural soil features, plant life, and rare animal species. No nature reserves or monuments have been created on its slopes.

On the southeastern slope of the mountain, a 26.5 km long educational trail named Naučná stezka Muzeum Wide Web has been marked, with the route Malá Morávka – Karlovice (featuring 17 observation points along the way).

Additionally, at the base of the southeastern slope, approximately 2.6 km southeast of the summit, at an elevation of around 720 metres above sea level, there is an old European silver fir, recognized as a memorial tree in 2001. This tree, known as Jedle Vévodkyně, stands at approximately 46.5 metres tall with a trunk circumference of 473 cm. It is currently the tallest recorded fir tree in the Czech Republic (as of 2021).

== Tourism ==
=== Hiking trails ===
There are no marked tourist trails leading to or crossing the summit of Lyra.

=== Cycling routes ===
Three cycling routes cross the mountain area:

Vrbno pod Pradědem – Zámecká hora – Plošina – Žárový vrch–SV – Žárový vrch – Lyra – Lyra–J – Kóta pass

Route No. 553: Drakov – Vrbno pod Pradědem – Ludvíkov – Karlova Studánka – Hvězda pass – Malá Morávka – Dolní Moravice – Harrachovský kopec – Rýmařov

Route No. 6029: Valšov – Bruntál – Rudná pod Pradědem – Světlá Hora – Hvězda Pass – Karlova Studánka – Kóta Pass – Vidly – Vrbno pod Pradědem

==== Road climbs ====
Two road climbs are popular with cyclists, both traversing the slopes of Lyra:

Road climbs
Number	Route	Designation	Length (kilometres)	Elevation gain (metres)	Average gradient (%)	Number of road loops
1	Vidly – Kóta pass	450	3.4	234	6.9	1
2	Hvězda pass – Kóta pass	450	4.0	143	3.6	0

=== Ski routes ===
There are no downhill skiing routes on Lyra. During the snow season, a cross-country ski route passes through the mountain:

Karlova Studánka – Skalnatý vrch – Lyra – Žárový vrch – Plošina – Zámecká hora – Vrbno pod Pradědem
