= Kopřivná (mountain) =

Mountain in the Czech Republic

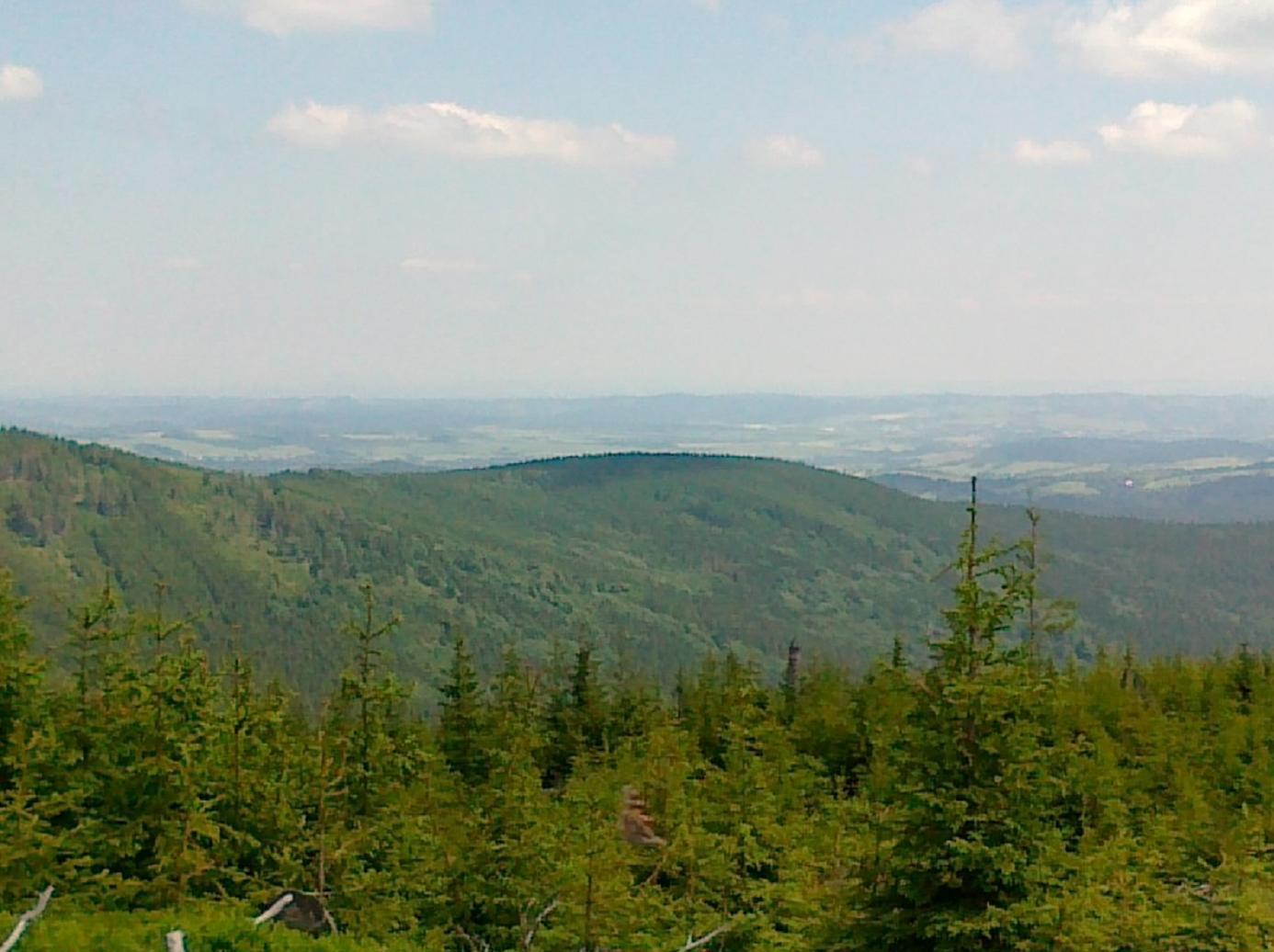
- View from the slope of Malý Máj mountain to Kopřívná

Highest point
- Elevation: 1,019 m (3,343 ft)
- Prominence: 13 m (43 ft)
- Coordinates: 50°02′15.7″N 17°16′50.2″E

Geography
- Location within Czech Republic
- Location: Malá Morávka, Czech Republic
- Parent range: Hrubý Jeseník

Kopřivná (German: Kalk Berg) is a mountain in the Hrubý Jeseník mountain range in the Czech Republic. It has an elevation of 1,019 m (3,343 ft) above sea level. It is located in the municipality of Malá Morávka.

== Characteristics ==
=== Location ===
Kopřivná is located slightly to the southeast of the center of the Hrubý Jeseník mountain range, in the eastern area (microregion) known as the Praděd Massif (Czech: Pradědská hornatina). It is situated on a side, southeast branch of the main ridge (crest) of Praděd mountain (stretching from Červenohorské sedlo pass to Skřítek pass), which runs from Vysoká hole to Kapličkový vrch mountain (in the series of peaks: Vysoká hole → Temná → Skály pod Kopřivnou → Kopřivná-SZ → Kopřivná → Kapličkový vrch) and has a domed shape at the summit. It is located near the village of Malá Morávka and the road No. 445 from Rýmařov to Zlaté Hory. The mountain is well visible, among others, from the main ridge path near the summit of Malý Maj-SZ. From other nearby locations, due to forestation, it is not visible and practically unrecognizable. It is also not visible from the road surrounding the summit area of Praděd, as it is obscured by Vysoká hole, and from another characteristic viewpoint – from the road surrounding the summit of Dlouhé stráně, it is also not visible, as it is obscured by Kamzičník peak.

The mountain is bordered by:

- to the northwest: a pass at an elevation of 1,014 m (3,327 ft) above sea level towards Temná peak;
- to the northeast: the valley of the stream named Krátký potok;
- to the east: the valley of the stream Bělokamenný potok;
- to the southeast, two passes: the first at an elevation of 736 m (2,415 ft) above sea level towards Kalkzeche peak and the second at an elevation of 748 m above sea level towards Kapličkový vrch peak;
- to the south: a pass at an elevation of 905 m (2,969 ft) above sea level towards Kámen svobody peak;
- to the southwest: the valley of the Moravice river.

Surrounding peaks include:

- to the northeast: Hradečná, U pečí, Javorový vrch (2), (Note: The indexed designation distinguishes it from another peak with the same name located in the same range: Javorový vrch, situated about 800 m (2,600 ft) northeast of Videlské sedlo pass.) Javorový vrch (2)–JV, and Kosov;
- to the east: Železný vrch and Železný vrch–J;
- to the southeast: Skalisko, Kalkzeche, Kapličkový vrch, and Solný vrch–SV;
- to the south: Kámen svobody;
- to the southwest: Klobouk and Smolný vrch;
- to the west: Malý Máj;
- to the northwest: Malý Máj–SZ, Kamzičník, Vysoká hole–JZ, Vysoká hole, and Temná.

=== Slopes ===
Within the mountain, six main slopes can be distinguished:

- northwestern
- northeastern, named Sedlisko, Mezi potoky
- eastern, named Vrátičná, Vápenná, Ztracená
- southeastern, named Borčí
- southern, named Srázná
- southwestern, named U skalky

All types of forestation are present here: spruce forest, mixed forest,The forest stand of the entire Jeseníky Protected Landscape Area includes: European spruce 84%, European beech 10%, European larch 1.5%, sycamore maple 1.1%, birch 1%, common alder 0.8%, dwarf mountain pine 0.4%, grey alder 0.3%, (European silver fir, European ash, and linden) 0.2%, Scotch pine 0.1%, and others (Pinus mugo, oak, hornbeam, Norway maple, elm, rowan, green alder, aspen, poplar, and goat willow) 0.2%. and deciduous forest, with dense spruce forest slightly predominating. Significant areas covered by spruce and mixed forest are found on all slopes, and as the elevation decreases on the northeastern, eastern, southeastern, and southwestern slopes, areas of deciduous forest appear, with meadows at the base of the eastern and southeastern slopes. Almost all slopes feature glades, and the eastern slope has significant clear-cuts for ski runs and related ski lifts. At the base of the eastern and southeastern slopes, near road No. 445, there is an overhead power line of 22 kV supplying electricity to the buildings of Malá Morávka. All slopes have occasional larger rock outcrops and rock groups (e.g., Skály pod Kopřivnou). Additionally, the northeastern and southeastern slopes have significant boulder fields.

The slopes have relatively uneven, gentle, and varied inclinations. The average slope gradient ranges from 1° (northwestern slope) to 16° (southwestern slope). The average slope gradient for all slopes of the mountain (weighted arithmetic mean slope gradient) is approximately 8°. The maximum average slope gradient of the south slope, at an elevation of about 920 m above sea level, near rock groups, does not exceed 30° over a 50-meter section. The slopes are covered with a network of roads (e.g., Kmínkova cesta and Slezská cesta) and generally unmarked paths and trails.

=== Main summit ===
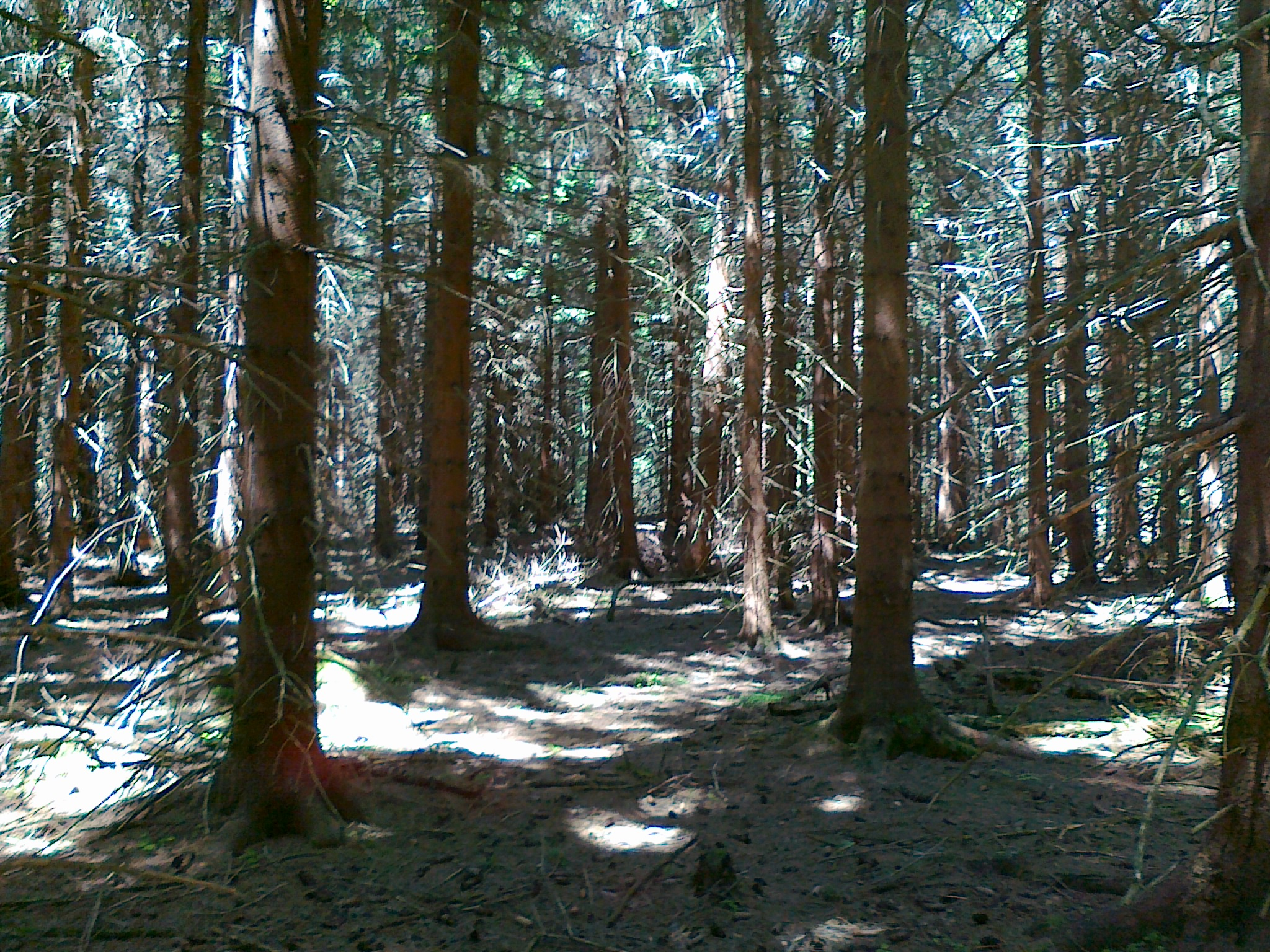
Kopřivná summit area

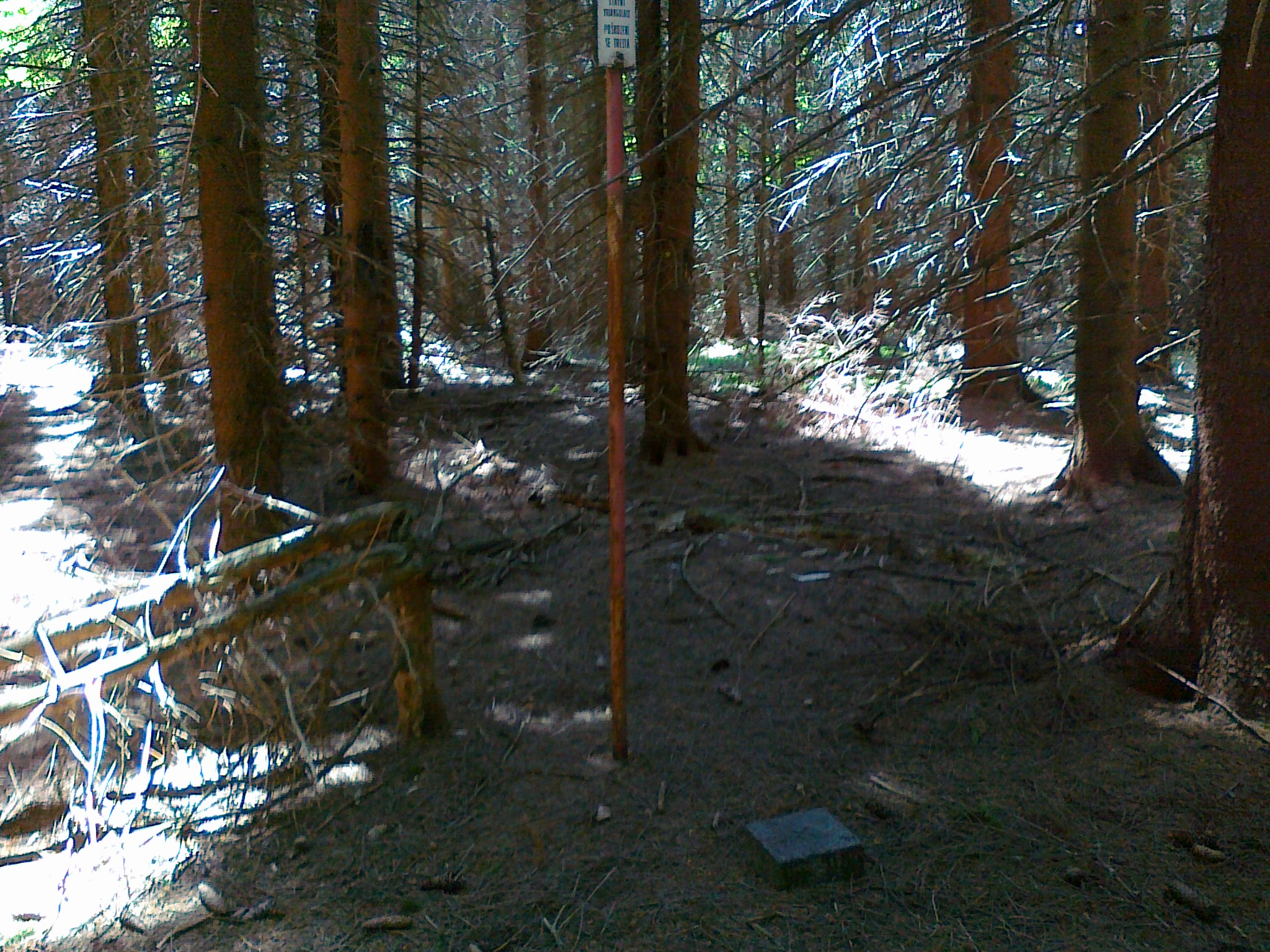
Triangulation station on Kopřivná summit area

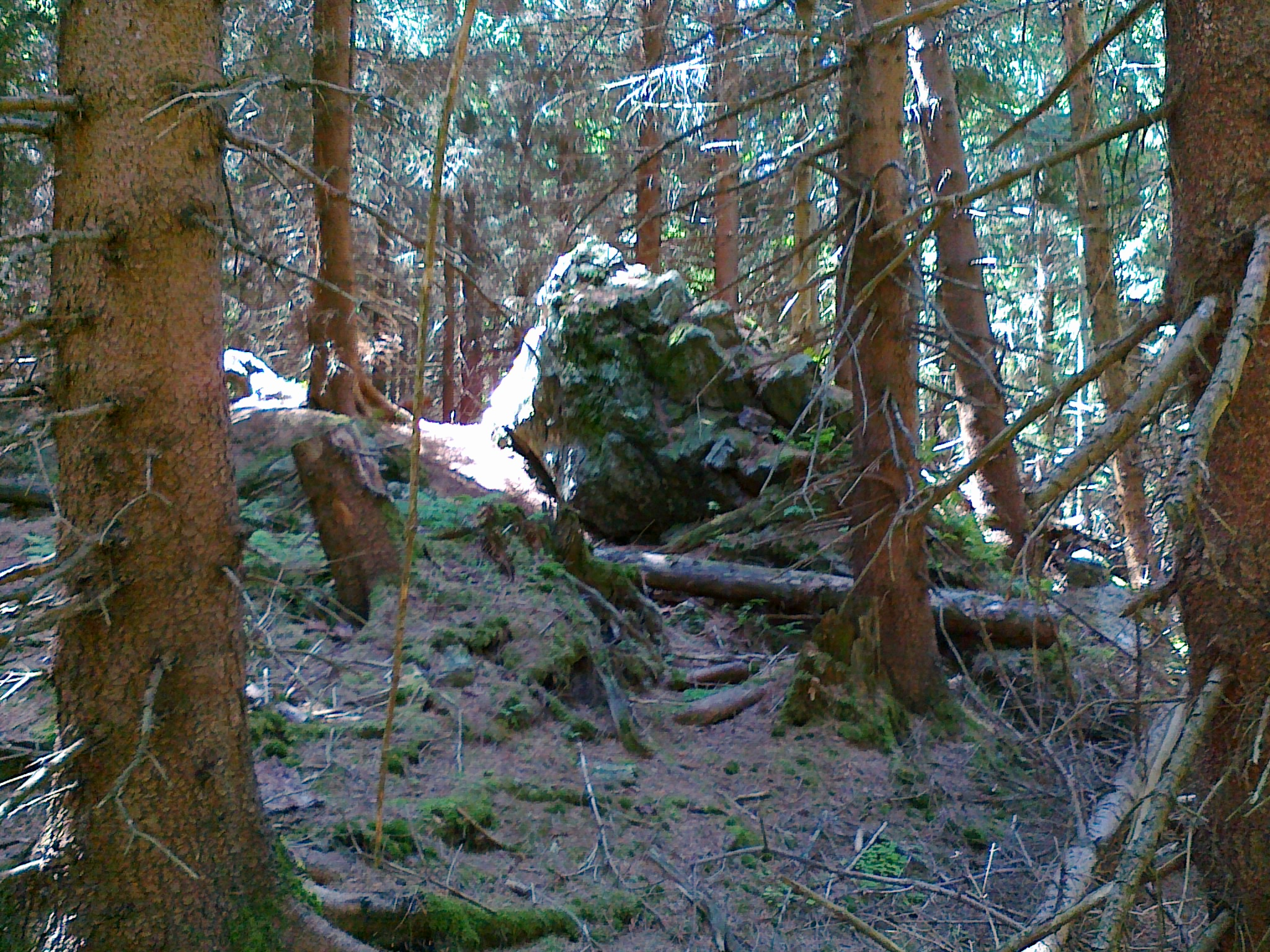
Rock formation near Kopřivná summit area

There is no marked tourist trail leading to the summit. A main ridge path (marked with two horizontal white stripes on tree trunks) runs across the summit area from the tourist junction (Czech: Skály pod Kopřivnou). The summit is located within dense spruce forest and, therefore, is not a viewpoint. About 15 m (49 ft) north of the summit, there is a rock formation with approximate horizontal dimensions of 50 m × 30 m (164 ft × 98 ft), covering an area of about 1,110 m^{2} (11,900 sq ft), surrounded by a spruce forest. The summit area contains a triangulation station, marked on geodetic maps with the number 12, at an elevation of 1,019.18 m (3,343.8 ft) above sea level and geographical coordinates 50°02′15.31″N 17°16′50.34″E. Next to this point, there is a steel post with a metal plate at the top bearing the inscription Státní triangulace Poškození se trestá. (Note: English: State triangulation network. Damage is subject to penalty.) The station is located near the main ridge path, about 11 m (36 ft) south of the summit. The State Administration of Land Surveying and Cadastre lists the highest point of the mountain – the summit – at 1,019.4 m (3,344 ft) above sea level and coordinates 50°02′15.7″N 17°16′50.2″E.

To reach the summit, one starts from the tourist junction Skály pod Kopřivnou, marked at an elevation of 1,014 m (3,327 ft). From this junction, one has to follow the yellow tourist trail towards the Pod Vápennou junction for about 140 m (460 ft), then turn right onto the main ridge path and continue for approximately 450 m (1,480 ft). Finally, one has to turn right again and proceed for about 30 m (98 ft) through the forest to reach the summit.

=== Secondary summit ===
Kopřivná is a mountain with a double summit. About 230 m (750 ft) northwest of the main summit, there is a secondary summit referred to as Kopřivná–SZ at an elevation of 1,017 m (3,337 ft) above sea level and geographical coordinates 50°02′20.3″N 17°16′41.1″E. It is located on the mountain ridge, near the main path, and is separated from the main summit by a minor pass at an elevation of 1,006 m (3,301 ft) above sea level. This secondary summit is also within dense spruce forest and, like the main summit, is not a viewpoint and does not have a triangulation station.

=== Geology ===
Geologically, the massif of Kopřivná belongs to the unit known as the Vrbno Group and is composed of metamorphic rocks: mainly phyllites (muscovites, biotites, chlorites, calcites), schists (graphites), green schists, and porphyroids, sedimentary rocks: mainly quartzites, meta-conglomerates, and meta-tuffs, as well as igneous rocks: mainly meta-diabases. The shape of the mountain and the presence of diabases suggest its volcanic origin.

=== Waters ===
The summit and its slopes are located southeast of the boundary of the European watershed, thus belonging to the Baltic Sea basin. Waters from this part of the Hrubý Jeseník, including the rivers (Moravice) and mountain streams (such as Krátký potok and Bělokamenný potok) near the mountain, flow into the Baltic Sea via the Oder river basin. Several short, unnamed streams that are tributaries of Krátký potok originate on the northeast slope. This slope also features several swampy areas. Additionally, small rectangular pools have been built on the eastern slope near mountain hotels: one (13 m × 7 m (43 ft × 23 ft)) at Horský hotel Kopřivná and another (10 m × 6 m (33 ft × 20 ft)) at Horský hotel Brans. Due to the relatively gentle slope inclines, there are no waterfalls or cascades on the mountain.

== Nature protection ==
A small section of the northeastern slope, approximately 230 m (750 ft) long, at elevations of between 811 and 828 m (2,661 and 2,717 ft) above sea level, is within the boundaries of the Javorový vrch National Nature Monument. This monument is part of the Jeseníky Protected Landscape Area, established to protect rock formations, soil, vegetation, and rare animal species.

=== Javorový vrch National Nature Monument ===
On the neighboring mountain, Javorový vrch (2), the Javorový vrch National Nature Monument was established on 1 October 2010, covering an area of 84.15 ha (207.9 acres). The monument includes a mixed spruce-beech forested area. It was created to protect one of the most significant bat wintering sites in the entire Czech Republic and to preserve an important geological site with the largest historical iron ore mining area in the Hrubý Jeseník mountains. The underground tunnels of old mines within the monument area are one of the five most important hibernaculum sites for the western barbastelle bat (Barbastella barbastellus), the greater mouse-eared bat (Myotis myotis), and an important wintering site for the lesser horseshoe bat (Rhinolophus hipposideros) in the Czech Republic.

=== Educational trails ===
At the foot of the southwestern slope (Moravice river valley), the Velká kotlina Educational Trail (Czech: Naučná stezka Velká kotlina) was established in 1971. This 5.5 km (3.4 mi) trail follows the blue tourist trail on the section:

- Karlov pod Pradědem – Nad Ovčárnou (featuring seven observation points along the route)

Additionally, a small section of the northeastern slope is part of another educational trail named the Mining Educational Trail Javorový vrch (Czech: Hornická naučná stezka Javorový vrch), which is approximately 4.2 km (2.6 mi) long on the section:

- Malá Morávka – Malá Morávka (featuring 16 observation points along the route)

== Tourism ==
- Praděd Hotel on the tower of Praděd;
- Kurzovní chata and Barborka mountain hut on the slopes of Praděd;
- Ovčárna and Figura mountain hotels, and Sabinka mountain hut on the slopes of Petrovy kameny.

A key tourist point is the Karlov (junction), located about 2.4 km (1.5 mi) southeast of the summit, at an elevation of 675 m (2,215 ft), where all tourist trails and one cross-country skiing trail intersect.

=== Tourist trails ===
The Czech Tourist Club has marked three tourist trails around the mountain:

Karlova Studánka – Bílá Opava valley – Ostrý vrch – Barborka mountain hut – U Barborky pass – Petrovy kameny – Ovčárna – Vysoká hole – Velká kotlina – Moravice river valley – Karlov pod Pradědem – Malá Morávka

Malá Morávka – Karlov pod Pradědem – Klobouk – Mravencovka pass – Jelenec – Jelenka – Mravenčí sedlo pass – Ostružná – Kamenec (2) (Note: The indexed designation distinguishes it from two other peaks in the same range with the same name: Kamenec (1) located 3.8 km (2.4 mi) east of the town Loučná nad Desnou and Kamenec (3) located 1.7 km (1.1 mi) east of the town Bělá pod Pradědem.) – Žďárský Potok – Výhledy – Kamenná hora – Oskava

Karlova Studánka – Bílá Opava valley – Ostrý vrch – Bílá Opava waterfalls – Petrovy kameny – Ovčárna – Vysoká hole – Temná – Kopřivná – Karlov pod Pradědem – Malá Morávka

=== Cycling routes ===
A section of the northeastern slope on road No. 445 features a cycling route:

Route No. 553: Rýmařov – Harrachovský kopec – Dolní Moravice – Malá Morávka – Hvězda pass – Karlova Studánka – Vrbno pod Pradědem – Drakov

There is also a cycling ascent on road No. 445 to Hvězda pass from Rýmařov, with a length of 16.6 km (10.3 mi), elevation gain of 265 m (869 ft), and an average gradient of 1.6%, without road loops.

The eastern slope hosts mountain biking trails in the Bikepark Kopřivná center:

Mountain biking trails in the Bikepark Kopřivná center
Number	Trail and name	Length of trail (km)	Elevation gain (m)	Average gradient (%)
1	Downhill Kopřivná	1.5	156	10.4
2	Spicy freeride	1.6	165	10.3
3	Gravity line	2.2	165	7.5
4	Funtrail	3.1	184	5.9

Additionally, Bikepark Kopřivná features a children's trail called Family 1, a pump track, and an airbag for bike jumps.

=== Skiing trails ===
During snow-covered periods, the area offers both downhill and cross-country skiing. Malá Morávka hosts the popular Ski Areál Kopřivna, featuring:

Downhill ski trails with lifts on Kopřivná
Number	Trail and marking	Length of trail (m)	Elevation gain (m)	Type of lift	Length of lift (m)
1	1	1,350	200	6-seater chairlift	908
2	2	930	200	6-seater chairlift	908
3	2	380	65	J-bar lift	380
4	Dětská sjezdovka	70	10	J-bar lift	41

The Ski Areál Kopřivna also includes a snow park and snow tubing track.

Two marked cross-country ski trails pass through the mountain:

Hvězda pass – Hradečná – Vysoká hole – Temná – Kopřivná – Karlov pod Pradědem – Malá Morávka

Malá Morávka – Kopřivná – Kámen svobody–JV – Karlov pod Pradědem – Klobouk – Mravencovka pass – V javořinách – Solný vrch – Malá Morávka
