= Bělá pod Pradědem =

- Municipality
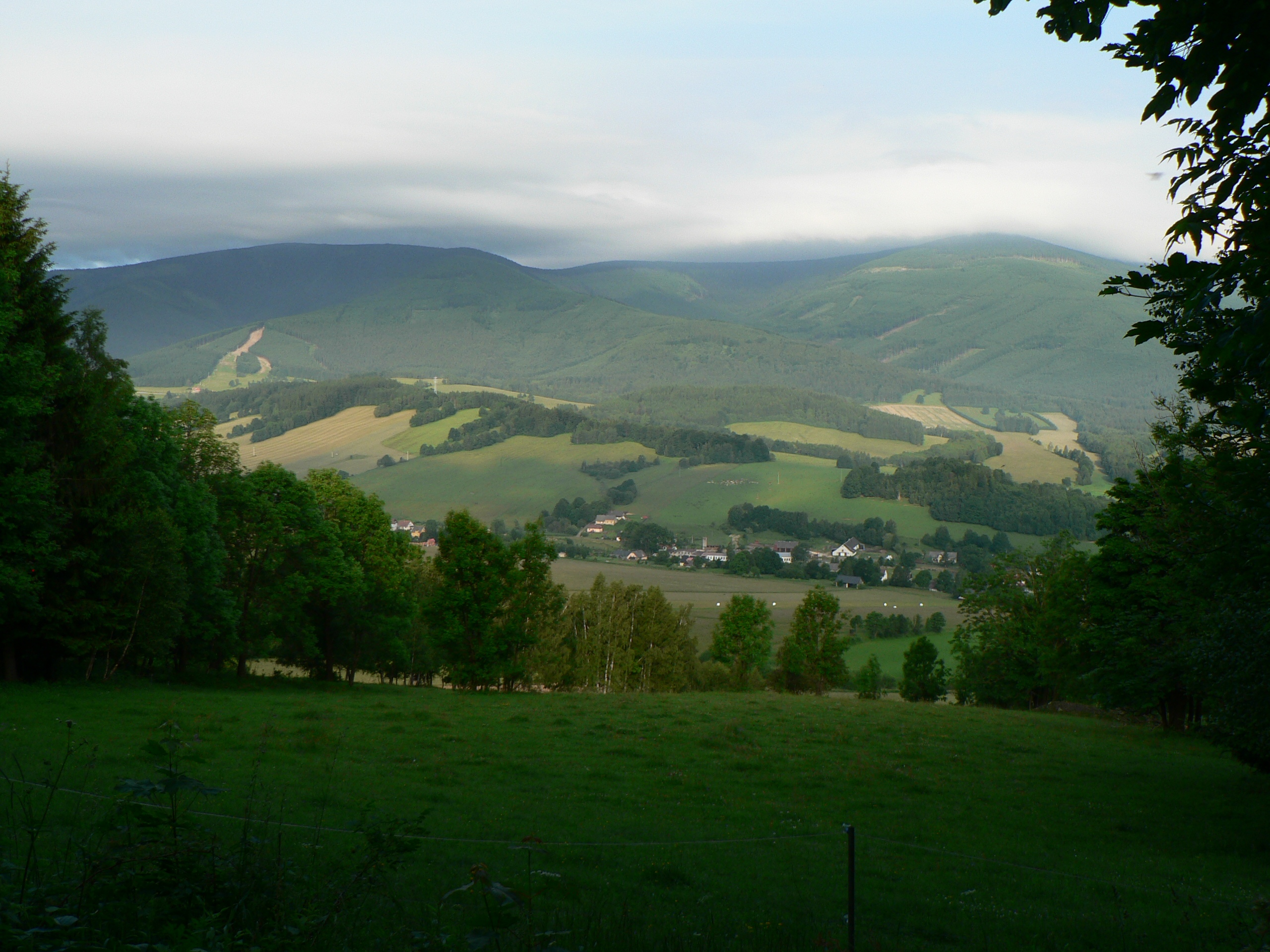
- Bělá pod Pradědem in the valley

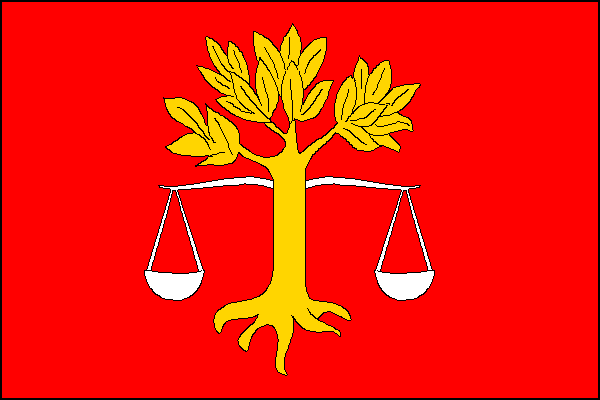
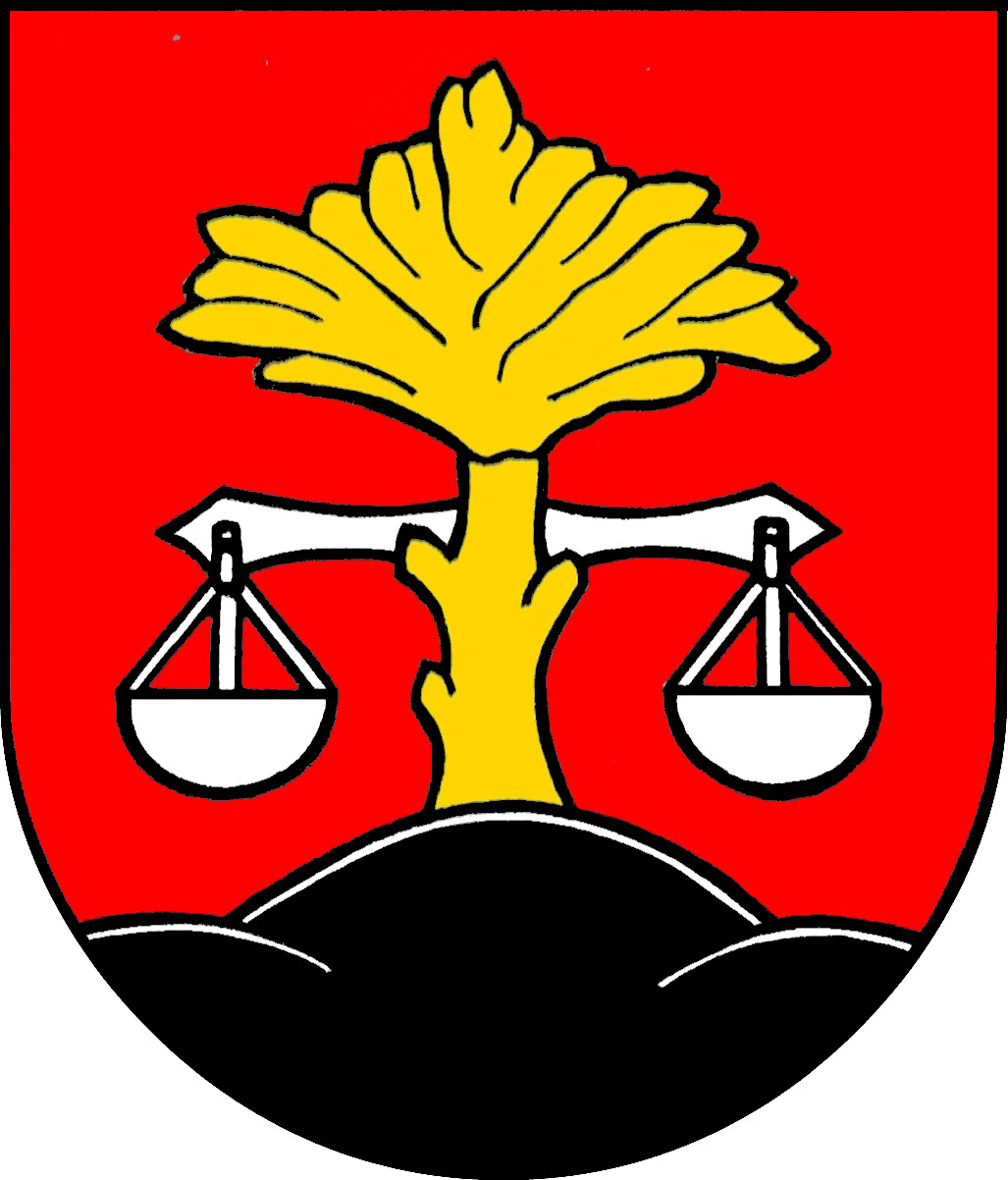
- Flag Coat of arms

- Location in the Czech Republic
- Coordinates: 50°7′54″N 17°12′57″E
- Country: Czech Republic
- Region: Olomouc
- District: Jeseník
- First mentioned: 1284

Area
  - Total: 92.23 km^{2} (35.61 sq mi)
- Elevation: 474 m (1,555 ft)

Population (2026-01-01)
  - Total: 1,701
  - Density: 18.44/km^{2} (47.77/sq mi)
- Time zone: UTC+1 (CET)
  - Summer (DST): UTC+2 (CEST)
- Postal code: 790 01
- Website: www.bela.cz

Bělá pod Pradědem (German: Waldenburg) is a municipality in Jeseník District in the Olomouc Region of the Czech Republic. It has about 1,700 inhabitants.

== Administrative division ==
Bělá pod Pradědem consists of four municipal parts (in brackets population according to the 2021 census):

- Adolfovice (715)
- Bělá (18)
- Domašov (845)
- Filipovice (22)

== Etymology ==
The municipality gained its name after the Bělá river and the nearby Praděd mountain.

== Geography ==
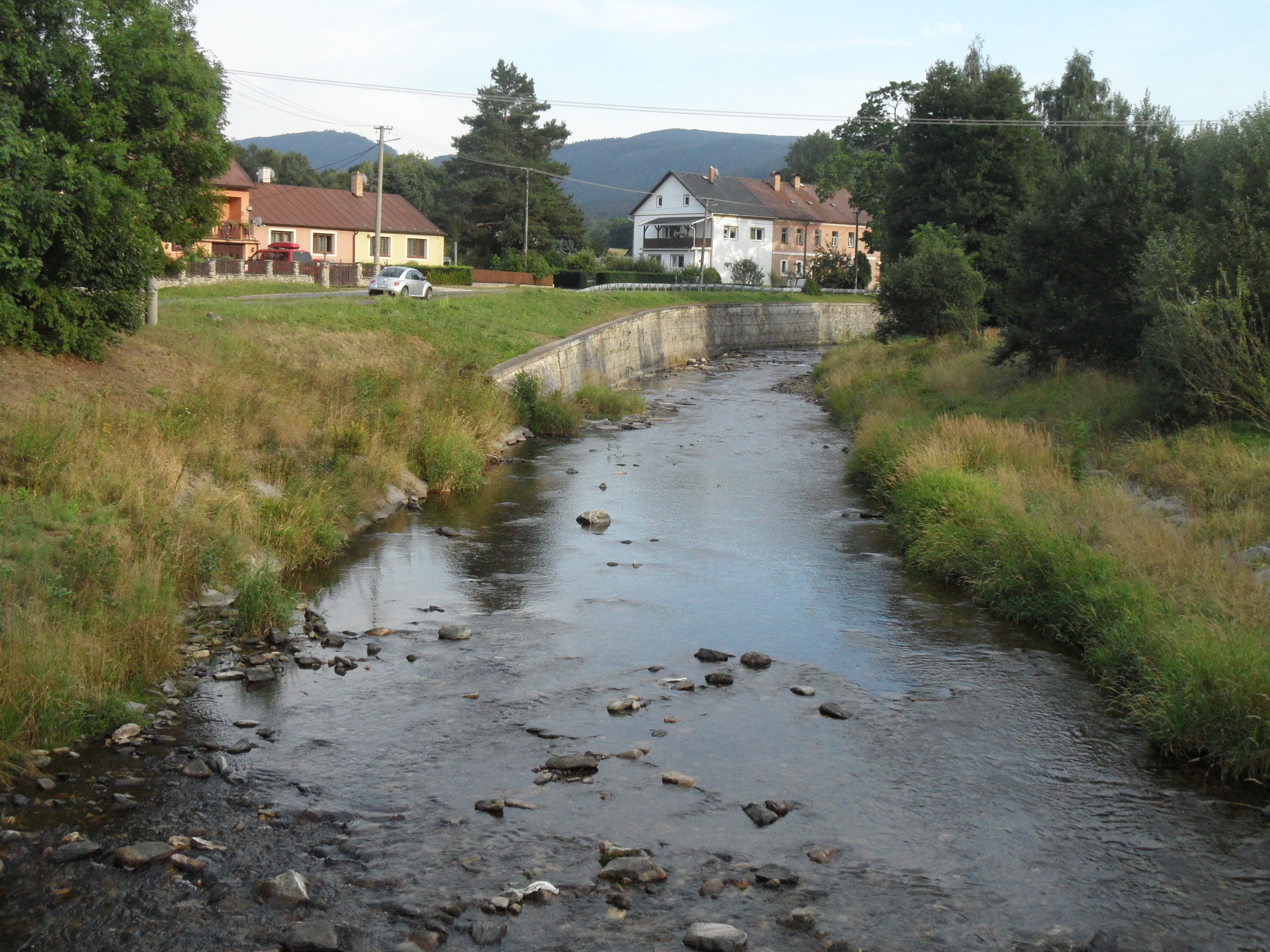
Bělá River in Adolfovice

Bělá pod Pradědem is located about 6 kilometres (4 mi) south of Jeseník and 60 km (37 mi) north of Olomouc. It lies in the Hrubý Jeseník mountains. The highest point is the peak of Malý Děd at 1,368 metres (4,488 ft) above sea level; Praděd is located outside the municipal territory. The Bělá River originates in the southern part of the municipality and the flows across the municipality; the villages are located in the valley of this river.

== History ==
Both villages of Adolfovice and Domašov were first mentioned in 1284. Both villages were founded in the second half of the 13th century, during the colonization by the bishops of Wrocław, who owned the area. The villages were included within the ecclesiastical Duchy of Nysa, which, later on, passed under suzerainty of the Bohemian Crown. In 1772, the hamlet of Filipov/Philippsdorf was founded by bishop Philipp Gotthard von Schaffgotsch, and in 1796 the hamlet of Bělá/Waldenburg was founded by bishop Josepf Christian Franz zu Hohenlohe-Waldenburg-Bartenstein. Both hamlets were joined to Domašov in 1848.

In 1850, the duchy was secularized and dissolved, and the villages were incorporated directly to Bohemia. After World War I, since 1918, the area formed part of Czechoslovakia.

During World War II, the area was occupied by Germany. On 9 October 1939, Luftwaffe military Junkers F 13 on the way from Opole to Olomouc crashed into the forest in Bělá pod Pradědem. All seven soldiers died in the accident and were buried at the cemetery in Domašov.

In Adolfovice, the occupiers operated three forced labour subcamps (E250, E334, E595) of the Stalag VIII-B/344 prisoner-of-war camp. After the war, in 1945, the German-speaking population was expelled in accordance with the Beneš decrees, and the area was restored to Czechoslovakia.

The municipality of Bělá pod Pradědem was established in 1961 by merger of municipalities of Adolfovice and Domašov, including the villages of Bělá and Filipovice.

== Demographics ==
Historical population

Year	Pop.	±%
1869	4,347	—
1880	4,678	+7.6%
1890	4,513	−3.5%
1900	4,109	−9.0%
1910	3,707	−9.8%

Year	Pop.	±%
1921	3,351	−9.6%
1930	3,596	+7.3%
1950	2,096	−41.7%
1961	1,802	−14.0%
1970	1,599	−11.3%

Year	Pop.	±%
1980	1,711	+7.0%
1991	1,736	+1.5%
2001	1,785	+2.8%
2011	1,747	−2.1%
2021	1,600	−8.4%

Source: Censuses

== Transport ==
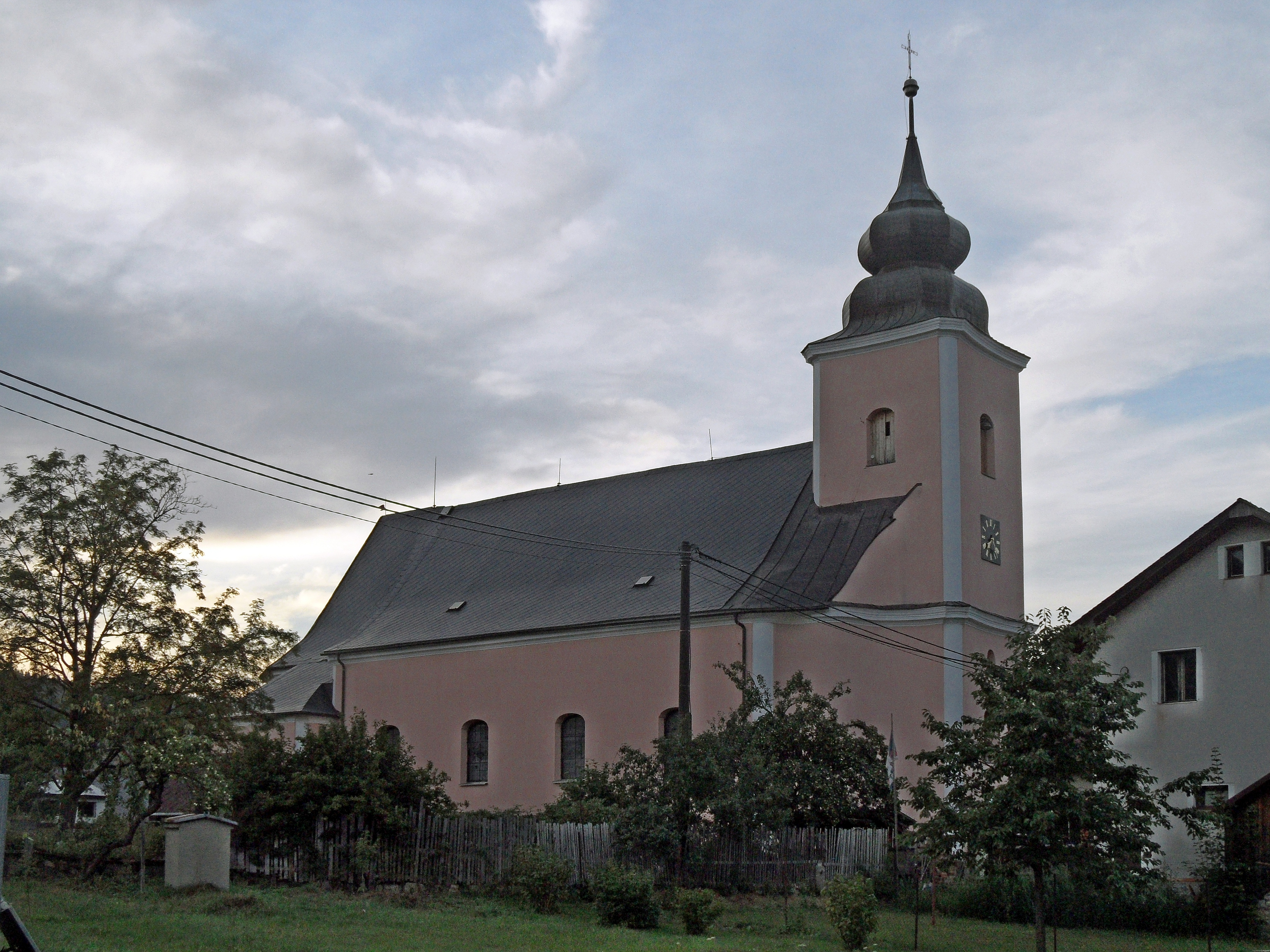
Church of Saint John the Baptist

The I/44 road from Šumperk to Jeseník runs through the municipality.

== Sights ==
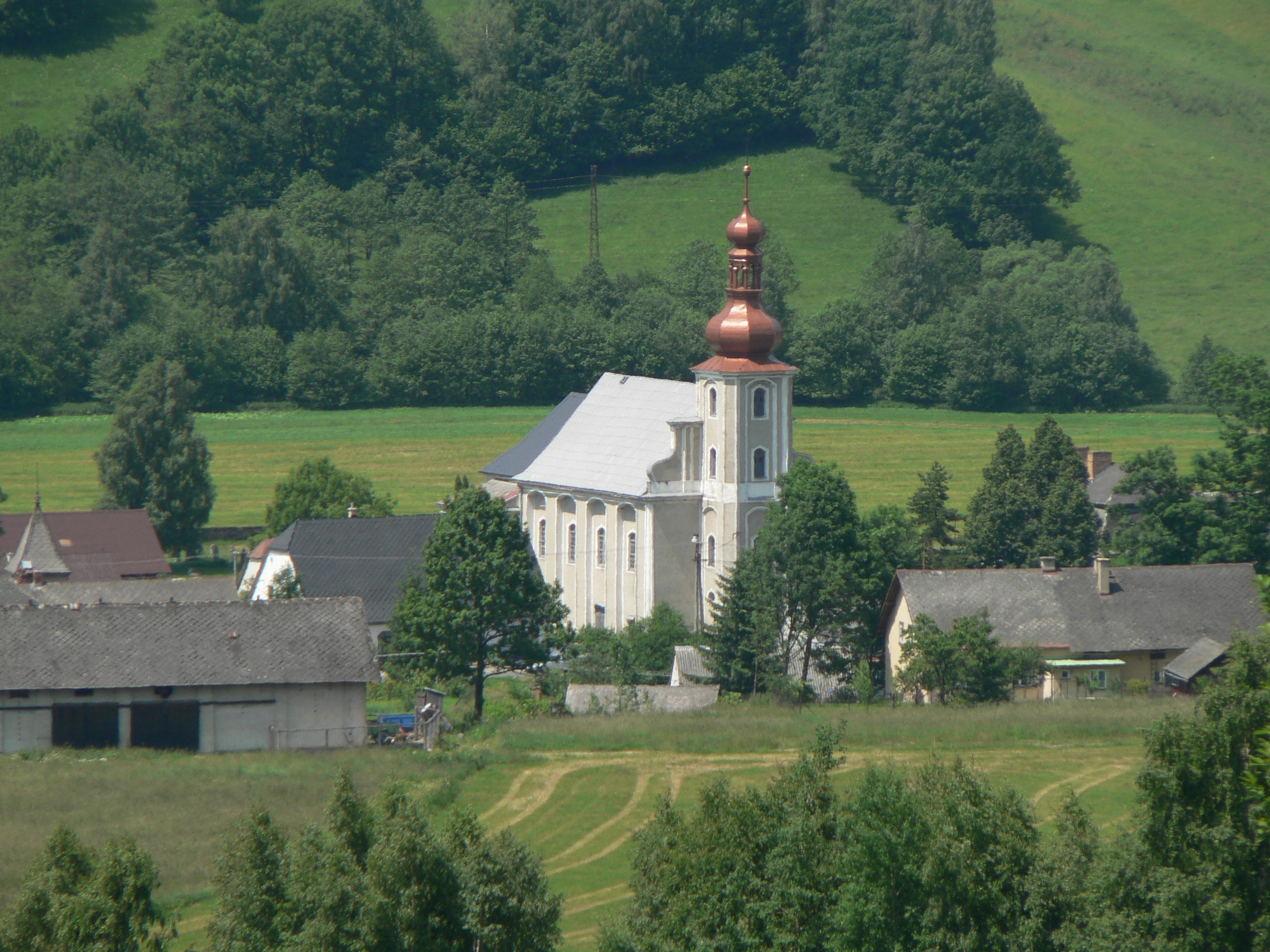
Church of Saint Thomas

There are two churches in Domašov. The Church of Saint Thomas was built in the Baroque style in 1726–1730. The Church of Saint John the Baptist is a Neoclassical building with late Baroque elements.

== Notable people ==
- Josef Odložil (1938–1993), athlete, Olympic medalist; lived here

== Twin towns – sister cities ==
Bělá pod Pradědem is twinned with:

- Tułowice, Poland
