= Rudná pod Pradědem =

- Municipality
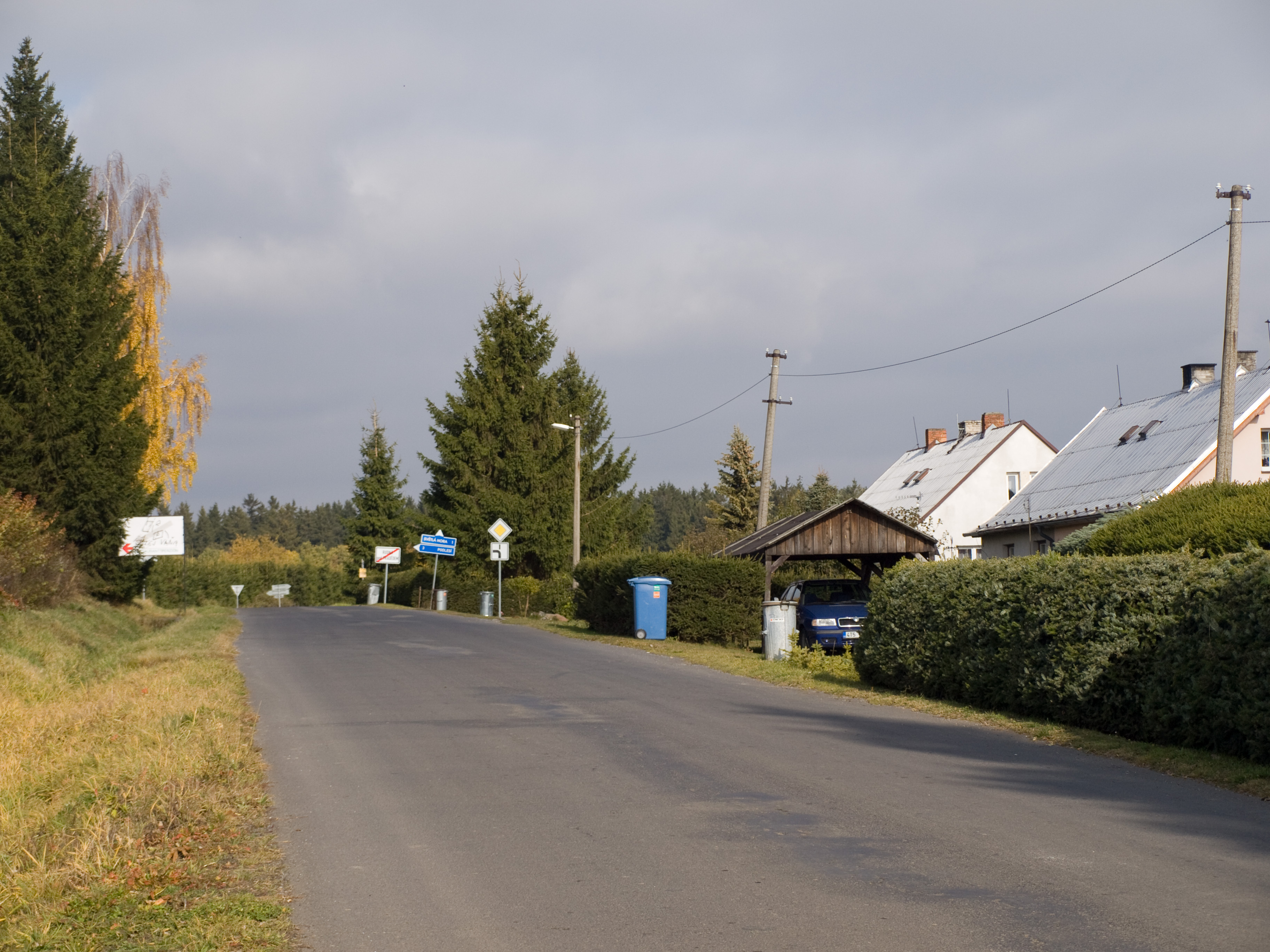
- Main road in Stará Rudná

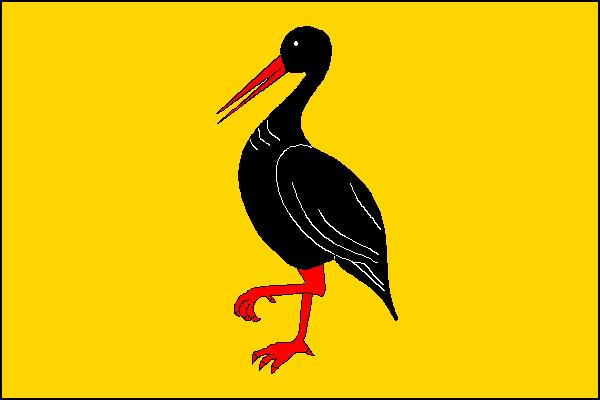
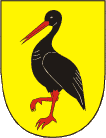
- Flag Coat of arms

- Location in the Czech Republic
- Coordinates: 50°1′6″N 17°20′41″E
- Country: Czech Republic
- Region: Moravian-Silesian
- District: Bruntál
- First mentioned: 1377

Area
  - Total: 21.82 km^{2} (8.42 sq mi)
- Elevation: 600 m (2,000 ft)

Population (2026-01-01)
  - Total: 358
  - Density: 16.4/km^{2} (42.5/sq mi)
- Time zone: UTC+1 (CET)
  - Summer (DST): UTC+2 (CEST)
- Postal code: 793 31
- Website: www.rudnapodpradedem.cz

Rudná pod Pradědem (until 1947 Vogelzejf; German: Vogelseifen) is a municipality in Bruntál District in the Moravian-Silesian Region of the Czech Republic. It has about 400 inhabitants.

== Administrative division ==
Rudná pod Pradědem consists of two municipal parts (in brackets population according to the 2021 census):

- Nová Rudná (37)
- Stará Rudná (330)

== Demographics ==
Historical population
Year	Pop.	±%
1869	1,145	—
1880	1,180	+3.1%
1890	1,123	−4.8%
1900	1,063	−5.3%
1910	1,016	−4.4%
1921	933	−8.2%
1930	920	−1.4%
1950	434	−52.8%
1961	388	−10.6%
1970	486	+25.3%
1980	458	−5.8%
1991	398	−13.1%
2001	385	−3.3%
2011	369	−4.2%
2021	367	−0.5%
Source: Censuses
