= Dolní Moravice =

- Municipality
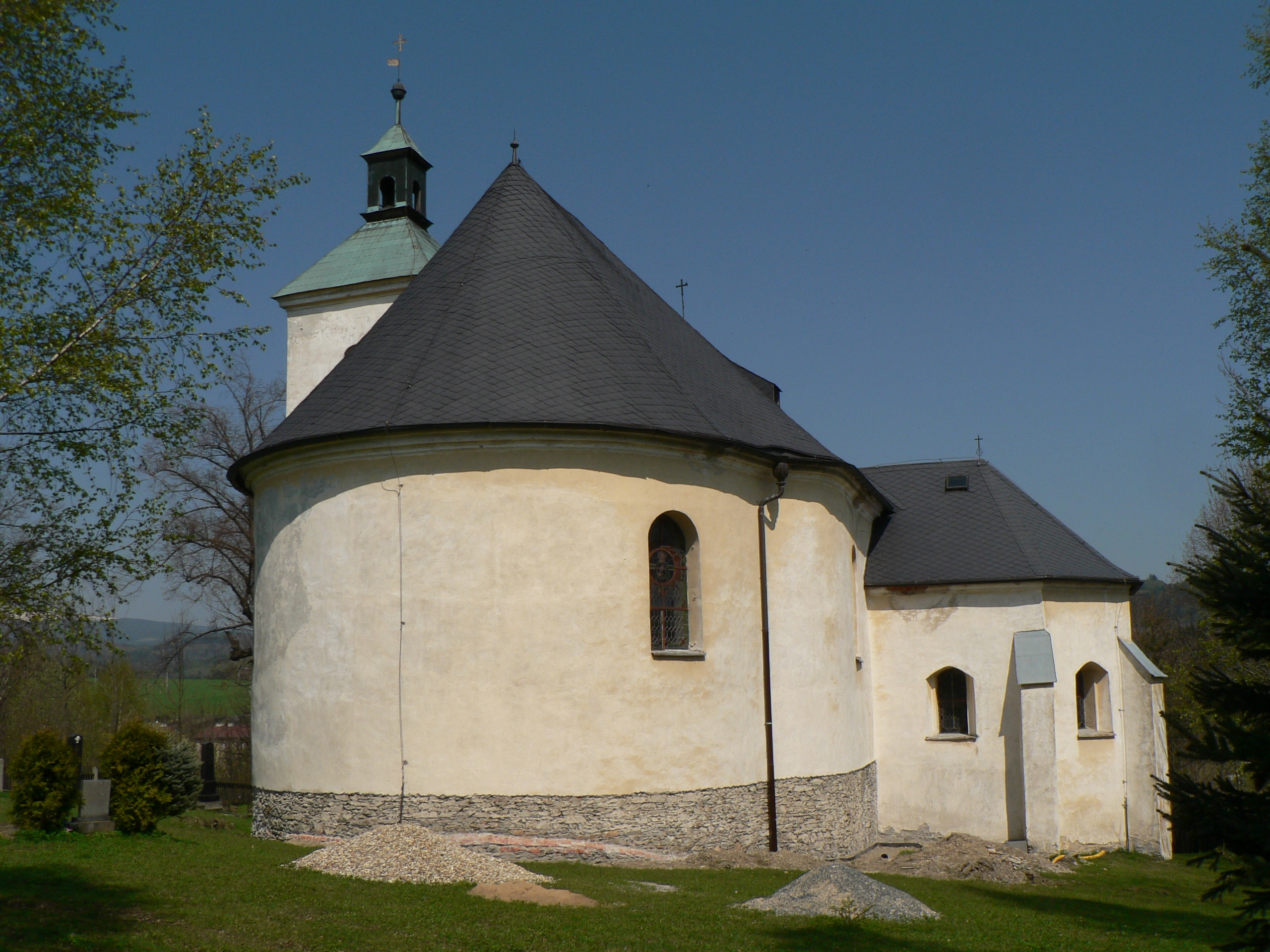
- Church of Saint James the Great

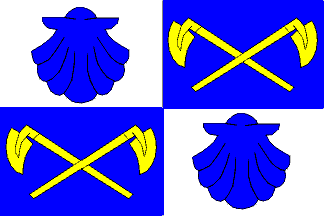
- Flag Coat of arms

- Location in the Czech Republic
- Coordinates: 49°58′38″N 17°19′18″E
- Country: Czech Republic
- Region: Moravian-Silesian
- District: Bruntál
- First mentioned: 1258

Area
  - Total: 22.22 km^{2} (8.58 sq mi)
- Elevation: 600 m (2,000 ft)

Population (2026-01-01)
  - Total: 369
  - Density: 16.6/km^{2} (43.0/sq mi)
- Time zone: UTC+1 (CET)
  - Summer (DST): UTC+2 (CEST)
- Postal code: 795 01
- Website: obecdolnimoravice.cz

Dolní Moravice (German: Nieder Mohrau) is a municipality and village in Bruntál District in the Moravian-Silesian Region of the Czech Republic. It has about 400 inhabitants. It lies on the Moravice River.

== Administrative division ==
Dolní Moravice consists of three municipal parts (in brackets population according to the 2021 census):

- Dolní Moravice (241)
- Horní Moravice (136)
- Nová Ves (17)

== History ==
The first written mention of Dolní Moravice is from 1258.

== Demographics ==
Historical population
Year	Pop.	±%
1869	1,820	—
1880	1,852	+1.8%
1890	1,790	−3.3%
1900	1,647	−8.0%
1910	1,607	−2.4%
1921	1,534	−4.5%
1930	1,510	−1.6%
1950	820	−45.7%
1961	535	−34.8%
1970	444	−17.0%
1980	373	−16.0%
1991	346	−7.2%
2001	357	+3.2%
2011	395	+10.6%
2021	394	−0.3%
Source: Censuses
