= Praděd =

Mountain in the Czech Republic

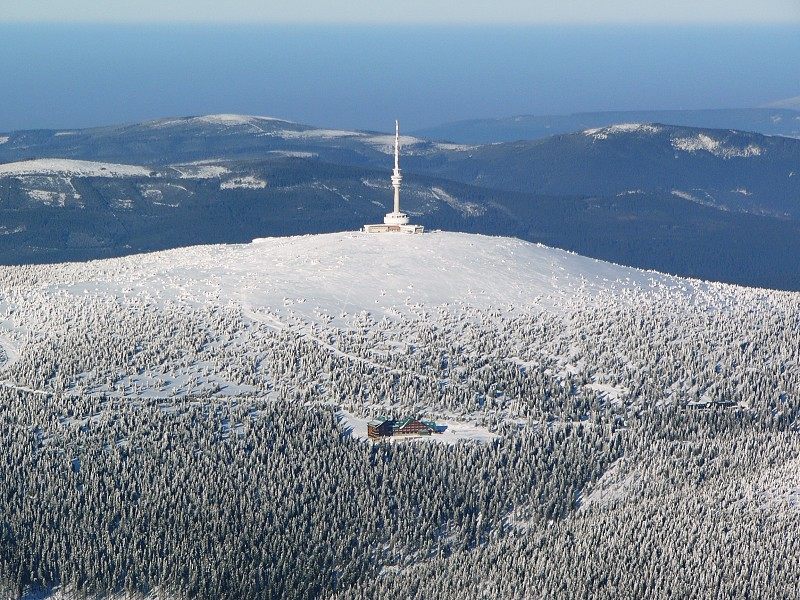
- Aerial view of Praděd

Highest point
- Elevation: 1,491 m (4,892 ft)
- Prominence: 983 m (3,225 ft)
- Isolation: 127.9 km (79.5 mi) to Sněžka
- Coordinates: 50°5′0″N 17°14′0″E

Geography
- Location within Czech Republic
- Location: Loučná nad Desnou
- Country: Czech Republic
- Parent range: Hrubý Jeseník

Praděd (Czech pronunciation: [ˈpraɟɛt]; German: Altvater) is a mountain in the Hrubý Jeseník range in the Czech Republic. At 1,491 metres (4,892 ft) above sea level, it is the highest mountain of Hrubý Jeseník and the fifth-highest mountain of the Czech Republic. It is also the highest peak of the historical regions of Moravia, Czech Silesia and Upper Silesia. The highest point of Moravia is located near the summit of Praděd; but the summit itself is in Czech Silesia.

The average annual temperature is about 1 °C (34 °F). A television transmitter is situated on the top, 162 m (531 ft) high. The upper platform is used as a watchtower. The mountain is also a popular area for skiing.

== Etymology ==
The name literally means 'great grandfather'.

== History ==
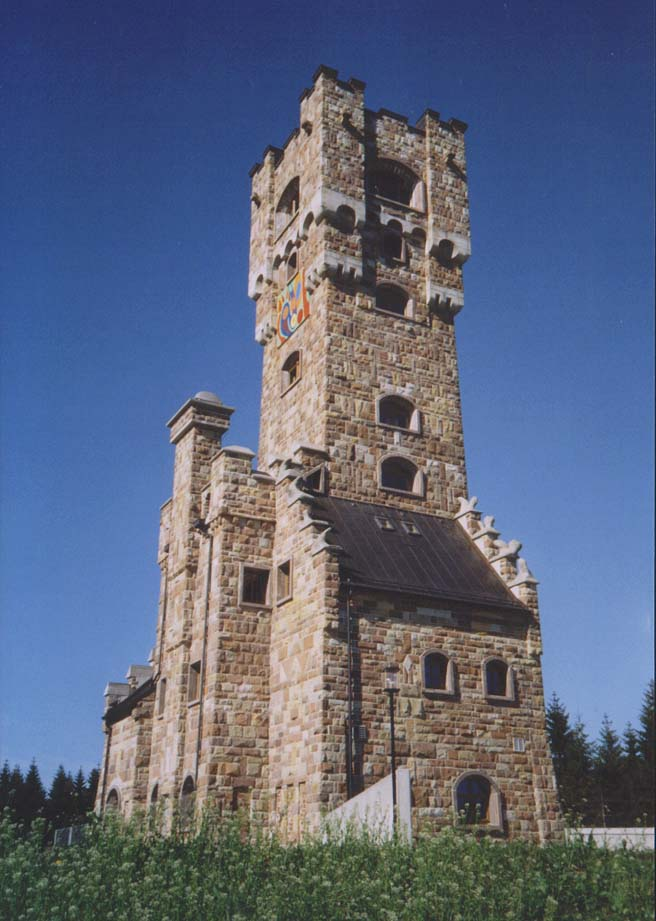
As a copy of the original Altvaterturm, this was built in 2004 on the Wetzstein in Germany

The first building on the mountain was a stone watchtower, 32 m (105 ft) high. It was built in 1903–1912 by the Sudeten German tourist association. After 1945, the tourist association no longer existed because all Germans were expelled. Due to its unmaintained condition in communist Czechoslovakia, with water freezing in cracks breaking it up, the watchtower collapsed 2 May 1959 shortly before it was supposed to get fixed.

The Petrovy kameny ("Peter's stones") is a gneiss stone formation near the peak. In the Middle Ages, people feared the place, believing witches lived there. The area is home to many rare plants, so it is not open to the public.

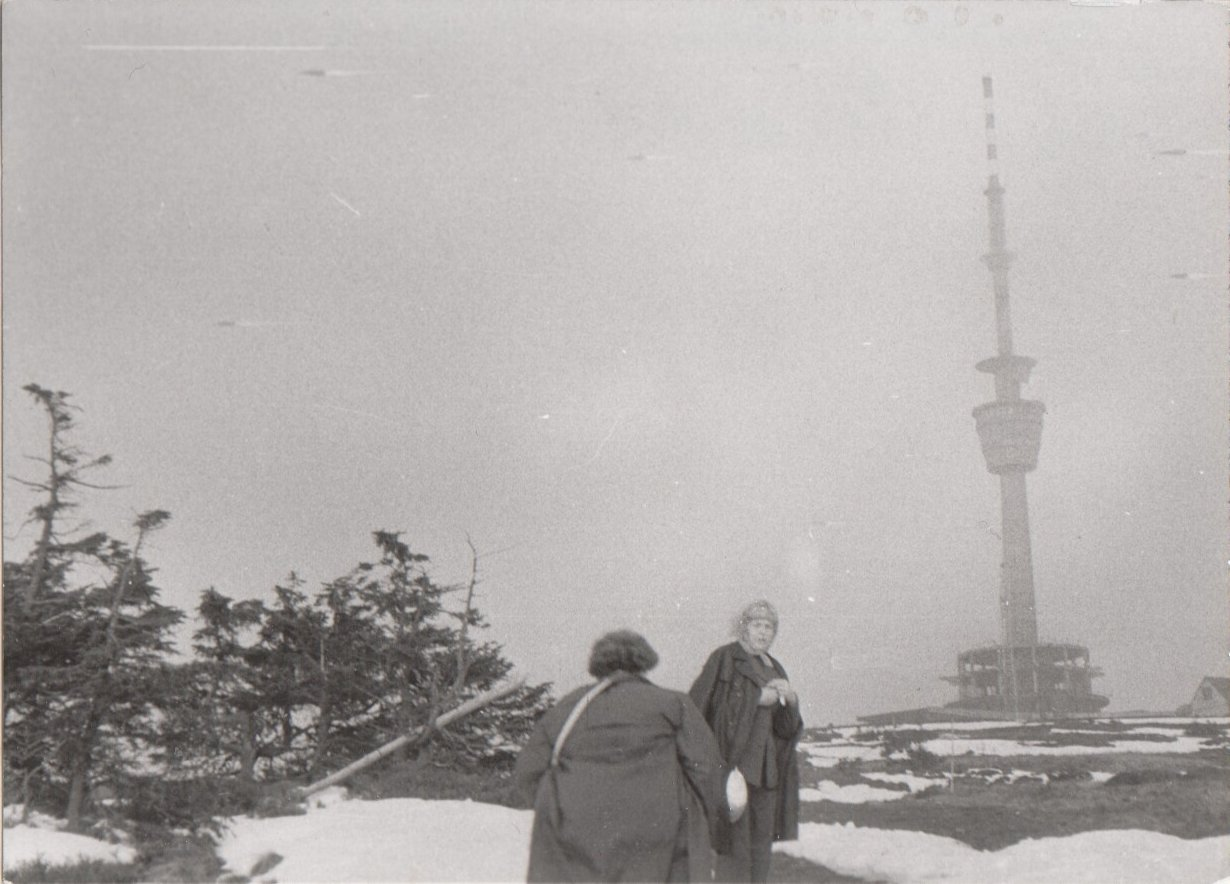
Photo taken during construction of the transmitter

The transmitter was built between 1968 and 1983. A restaurant is located in the building and can be reached by a paved road. The High Tatras, Malá Fatra Mts. and Alps can be seen from the watchtower platform.

=== 1950 air accident ===
On 27 February 1950 at 07:31 Československé státní aerolinie Douglas C-47A-15-DK on its way from Ostrava-Hrabůvka Airport to Prague Ruzyně Airport crashed into the side of Praděd mountain, killing 3 crew and 3 passengers. 25 others, including 21 passengers and 4 crew survived the accident.

== Protection of nature ==
Praděd lies in the Jeseníky Protected Landscape Area. The area of the peak and its surroundings is also specially protected as the Praděd National Nature Reserve. The protection was declared on 4 June 1955. With an area of 2,029.63 ha (5,015.3 acres), it is the largest national nature reserve in the country.

=== Fauna and flora ===
The most important plant species that grow here are Poa riphaea, Campanula gelida, Plantago atrata subsp. sudetica, Dianthus carthusianorum subsp. sudeticus, and Carlina biebersteinii subsp. sudetica. Among the fauna, the rarest are the butterflies Erebia sudetica subsp. sudetica, Erebia epiphron subsp. silesiana, Sparganothis rubicundana, and Epichnopterix sieboldii.

== Climate ==
Praděd is located within the alpine climate zone (Köppen ETH).

=== Historical data ===
Climate data for Praděd, Czech Republic (1961–1997)
Month	Jan	Feb	Mar	Apr	May	Jun	Jul	Aug	Sep	Oct	Nov	Dec	Year
Record high °C (°F)	10.9 (51.6)	10.7 (51.3)	14.0 (57.2)	18.1 (64.6)	21.6 (70.9)	25.4 (77.7)	25.2 (77.4)	24.6 (76.3)	24.3 (75.7)	19.4 (66.9)	13.8 (56.8)	9.0 (48.2)	25.4 (77.7)
Mean daily maximum °C (°F)	−4.6 (23.7)	−4.4 (24.1)	−1.9 (28.6)	2.5 (36.5)	8.3 (46.9)	11.3 (52.3)	13.1 (55.6)	13.2 (55.8)	9.4 (48.9)	5.4 (41.7)	−0.3 (31.5)	−3.5 (25.7)	4.0 (39.3)
Daily mean °C (°F)	−7.0 (19.4)	−6.8 (19.8)	−4.4 (24.1)	−0.4 (31.3)	4.8 (40.6)	7.9 (46.2)	9.6 (49.3)	9.7 (49.5)	6.2 (43.2)	2.5 (36.5)	−2.7 (27.1)	−5.9 (21.4)	1.1 (34.0)
Mean daily minimum °C (°F)	−9.3 (15.3)	−9.0 (15.8)	−6.7 (19.9)	−2.9 (26.8)	2.1 (35.8)	5.2 (41.4)	6.8 (44.2)	7.0 (44.6)	3.8 (38.8)	0.3 (32.5)	−4.7 (23.5)	−8.1 (17.4)	−1.3 (29.7)
Record low °C (°F)	−28.0 (−18.4)	−25.4 (−13.7)	−24.5 (−12.1)	−14.0 (6.8)	−10.6 (12.9)	−4.9 (23.2)	−1.7 (28.9)	−1.4 (29.5)	−6.0 (21.2)	−13.4 (7.9)	−18.1 (−0.6)	−25.1 (−13.2)	−28.0 (−18.4)
Average precipitation mm (inches)	68.8 (2.71)	65.4 (2.57)	69.1 (2.72)	66.7 (2.63)	107.7 (4.24)	142.6 (5.61)	163.3 (6.43)	132.1 (5.20)	93.7 (3.69)	70.2 (2.76)	77.0 (3.03)	82.2 (3.24)	1,138.8 (44.83)
Average snowfall cm (inches)	93.8 (36.9)	92.8 (36.5)	85.2 (33.5)	55.6 (21.9)	13.7 (5.4)	2.4 (0.9)	0.0 (0.0)	0.1 (0.0)	4.0 (1.6)	23.6 (9.3)	72.7 (28.6)	102.3 (40.3)	546.2 (214.9)
Average precipitation days (≥ 1.0 mm)	12.4	12.2	12.9	12.2	13.5	14.1	13.6	12.1	11.1	10.4	12.9	13.7	151.2
Average snowy days (≥ 1 cm)	14.2	14.1	13.8	10.3	2.9	0.4	0.0	0.0	0.9	4.7	11.4	14.7	87.5
Average relative humidity (%)	85.1	85.9	87.6	86.2	84.5	86.0	84.9	84.9	89.4	86.2	89.4	85.9	86.3
Mean monthly sunshine hours	66.1	70.7	97.6	123.9	162.0	153.7	171.7	171.6	121.4	115.3	54.3	59.1	1,367.5
Percentage possible sunshine	25	26	27	30	34	32	35	39	33	36	21	24	31
Source: CHMI
