= Lichnov =

Lichnov may refer to places in the Czech Republic:

- Lichnov (Bruntál District), a municipality and village in the Moravian-Silesian Region
- Lichnov (Nový Jičín District), a municipality and village in the Moravian-Silesian Region
