= Stará Ves =

Stará Ves may refer to places in the Czech Republic:

- Stará Ves (Bruntál District), a municipality and village in the Moravian-Silesian Region
- Stará Ves (Přerov District), a municipality and village in the Olomouc Region
- Stará Ves, a village and part of Bílovec in the Moravian-Silesian Region
- Stará Ves, a village and part of Stará Ves nad Ondřejnicí in the Moravian-Silesian Region
- Stará Ves, a village and part of Vysoké nad Jizerou in the Liberec Region
