= Oborná =

- Municipality
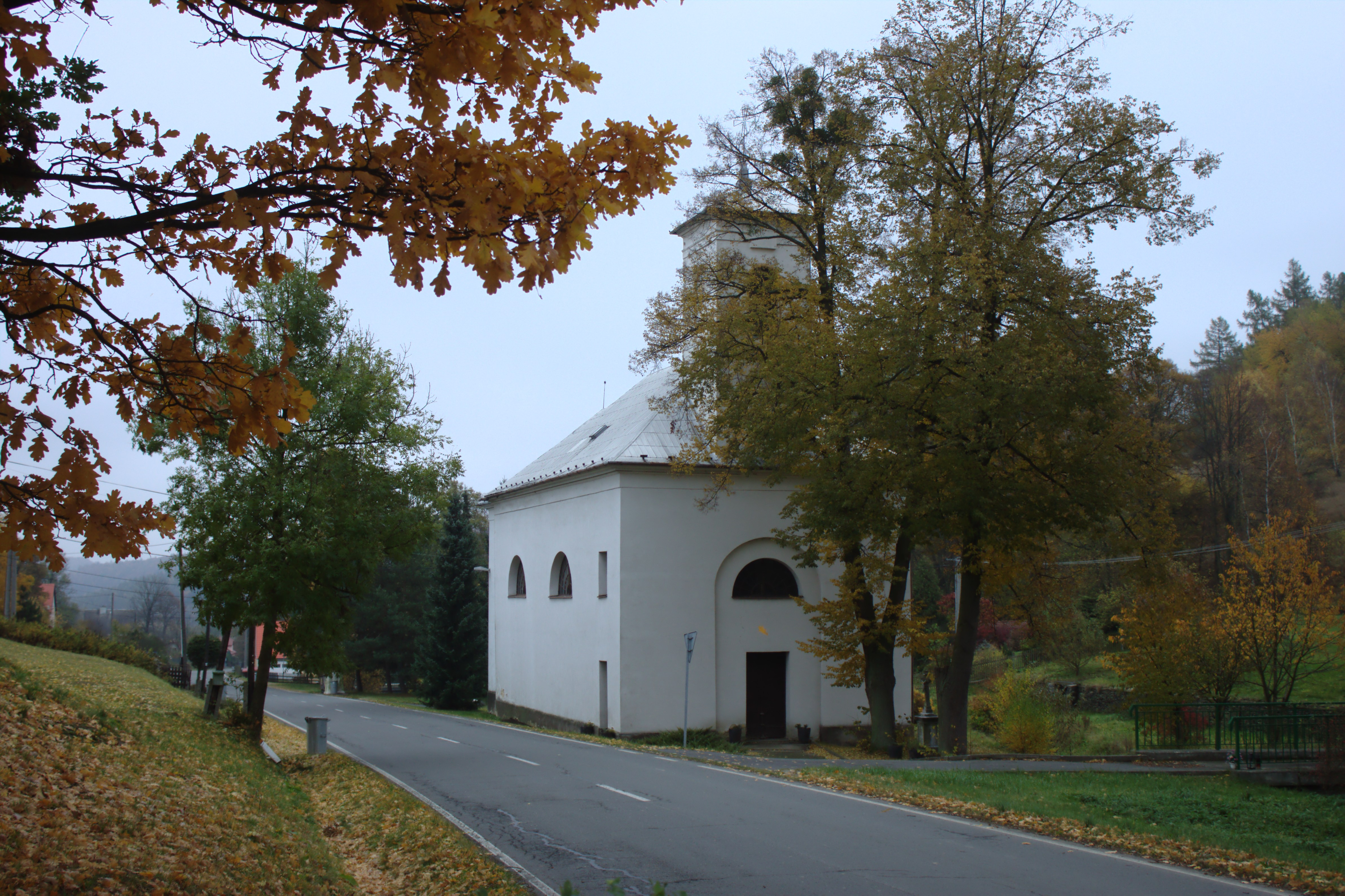
- Church of the Holy Trinity

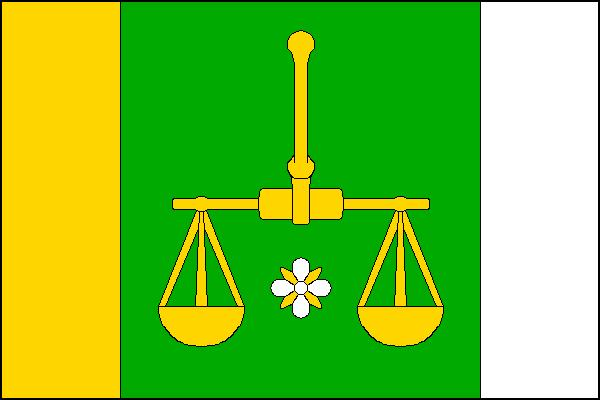
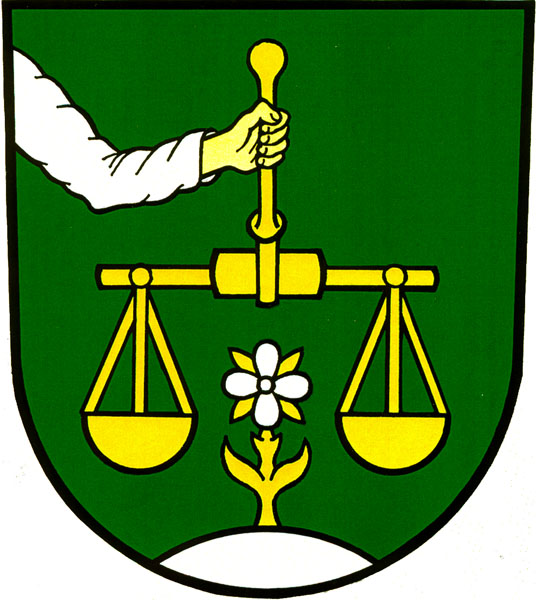
- Flag Coat of arms

- Location in the Czech Republic
- Coordinates: 50°0′11″N 17°29′49″E
- Country: Czech Republic
- Region: Moravian-Silesian
- District: Bruntál
- First mentioned: 1405

Area
  - Total: 5.33 km^{2} (2.06 sq mi)
- Elevation: 495 m (1,624 ft)

Population (2026-01-01)
  - Total: 446
  - Density: 83.7/km^{2} (217/sq mi)
- Time zone: UTC+1 (CET)
  - Summer (DST): UTC+2 (CEST)
- Postal code: 792 01
- Website: www.oborna.eu

Oborná (until 1947 Špilendorf; German: Spillendorf) is a municipality and village in Bruntál District in the Moravian-Silesian Region of the Czech Republic. It has about 400 inhabitants.

== Geography ==
Oborná is located about 2 kilometres (1 mi) northeast of Bruntál and 57 km (35 mi) northwest of Ostrava. It lies in the Nízký Jeseník range. The highest point is at 632 m (2,073 ft) above sea level. The built-up area lies in the valley of the stream Oborenský potok.

== History ==
The first written mention of Špilendorf is from 1405.

According to the Austro-Hungarian census of 1910, the municipality had 511 inhabitants, all of them were German-speaking. The most populous religious group were Roman Catholics with 505 (98.8%).

In 1947, the municipality was renamed from Špilendorf to its current name.

== Demographics ==
Historical population

Year	Pop.	±%
1869	498	—
1880	550	+10.4%
1890	558	+1.5%
1900	569	+2.0%
1910	511	−10.2%

Year	Pop.	±%
1921	459	−10.2%
1930	528	+15.0%
1950	311	−41.1%
1961	308	−1.0%
1970	282	−8.4%

Year	Pop.	±%
1980	341	+20.9%
1991	319	−6.5%
2001	336	+5.3%
2011	356	+6.0%
2021	426	+19.7%

Source: Censuses

== Transport ==
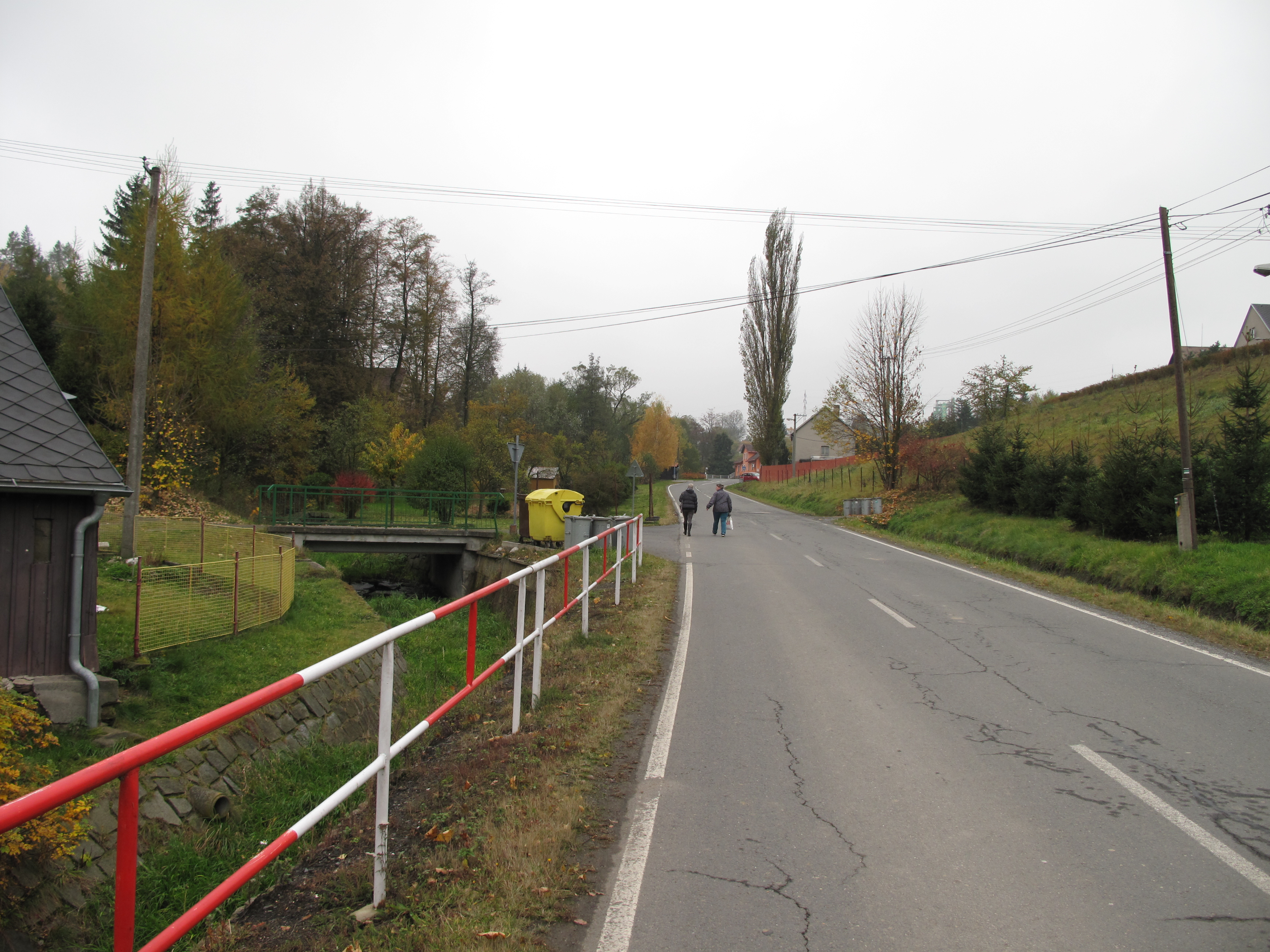
Main road

The I/45 road from Bruntál to Krnov runs through the municipality.

The railway line Bruntál–Milotice nad Opavou runs through the municipal territory, but there is no train station. The municipality is served by the station in neighbouring Bruntál.

== Sights ==
There are no protected cultural monuments in the municipality. The main landmark is the Church of the Holy Trinity.
