= Václavov u Bruntálu =

- Municipality
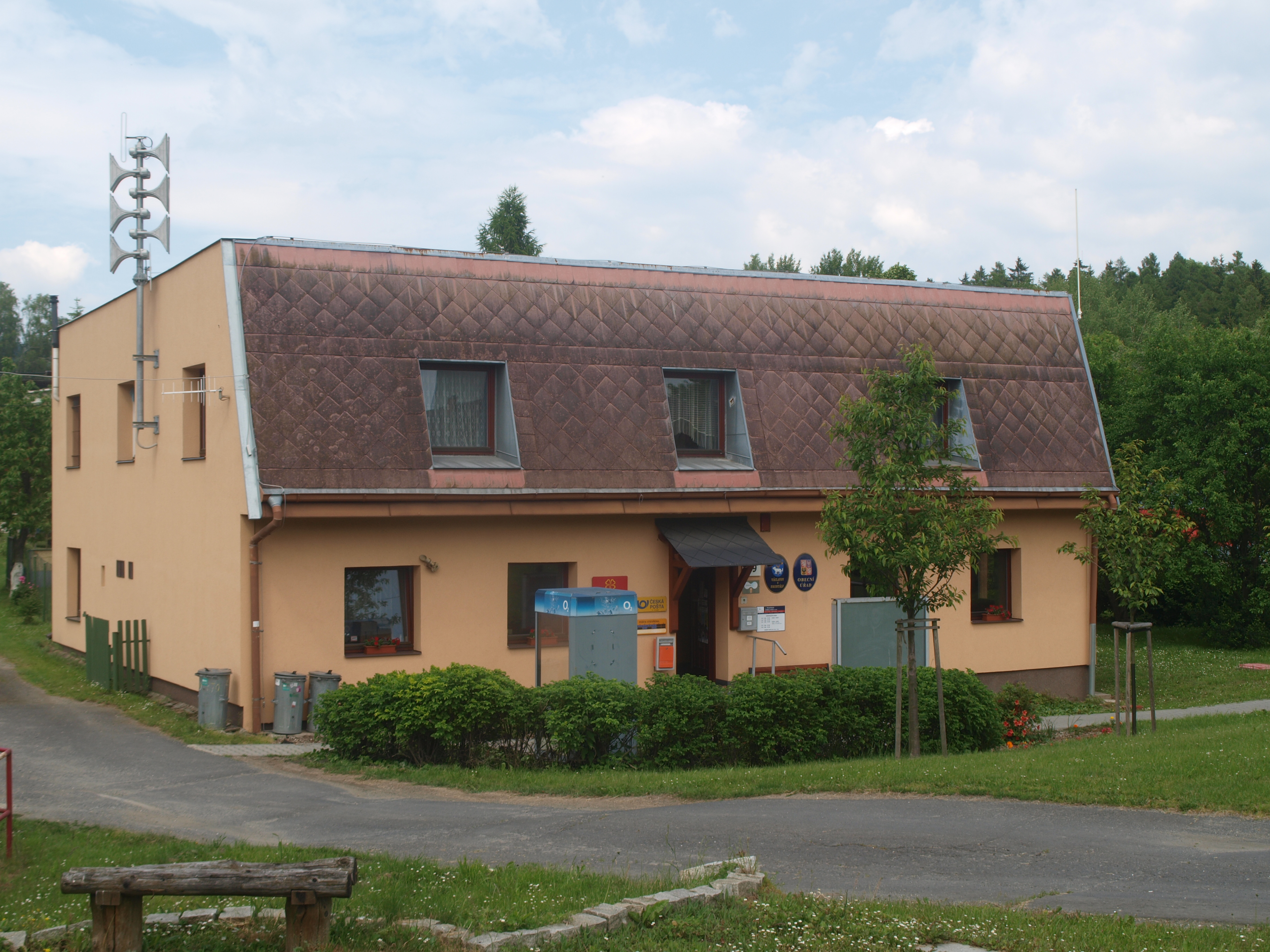
- Municipal office

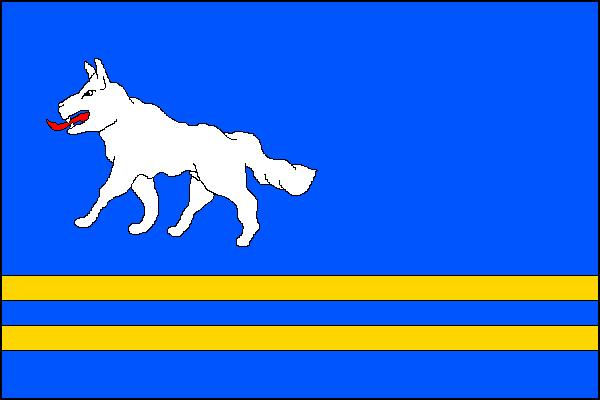
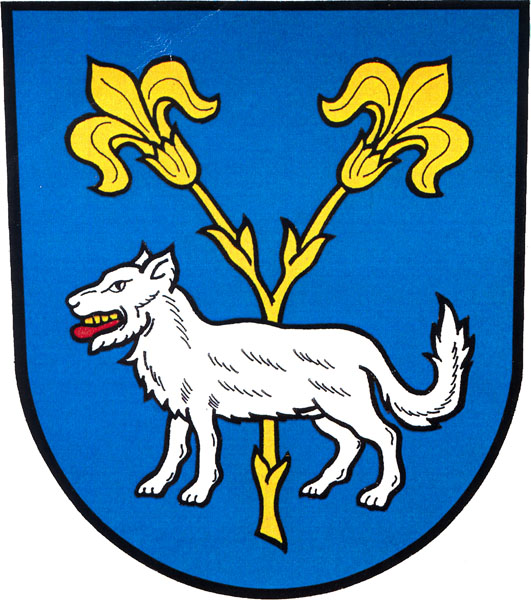
- Flag Coat of arms

- Location in the Czech Republic
- Coordinates: 49°58′29″N 17°22′35″E
- Country: Czech Republic
- Region: Moravian-Silesian
- District: Bruntál
- First mentioned: 1385

Area
  - Total: 25.78 km^{2} (9.95 sq mi)
- Elevation: 585 m (1,919 ft)

Population (2026-01-01)
  - Total: 474
  - Density: 18.4/km^{2} (47.6/sq mi)
- Time zone: UTC+1 (CET)
  - Summer (DST): UTC+2 (CEST)
- Postal code: 792 01
- Website: www.vaclavovubruntalu.cz

Václavov u Bruntálu (German: Wildgrub) is a municipality in Bruntál District in the Moravian-Silesian Region of the Czech Republic. It has about 500 inhabitants.

== Administrative division ==
Václavov u Bruntálu consists of two municipal parts (in brackets population according to the 2021 census):

- Dolní Václavov (140)
- Horní Václavov (327)

== History ==
The first written mention of Václavov is from 1385, when Dolní Václavov was called Nikolsaus. From 1405, it was called Dolní Václavov (Nieder Wildgrub), and Horní Václavov (Ober Wildgrub) was also documented.

== Demographics ==
Historical population
| Year | Pop. | ±% |
|---|---|---|
| 1869 | 1,308 | — |
| 1880 | 1,243 | −5.0% |
| 1890 | 1,197 | −3.7% |
| 1900 | 1,138 | −4.9% |
| 1910 | 1,145 | +0.6% |
| 1921 | 1,027 | −10.3% |
| 1930 | 1,045 | +1.8% |
| 1950 | 472 | −54.8% |
| 1961 | 507 | +7.4% |
| 1970 | 492 | −3.0% |
| 1980 | 458 | −6.9% |
| 1991 | 438 | −4.4% |
| 2001 | 483 | +10.3% |
| 2011 | 403 | −16.6% |
| 2021 | 467 | +15.9% |
Source: Censuses
