= Hošťálkovy =

- Municipality
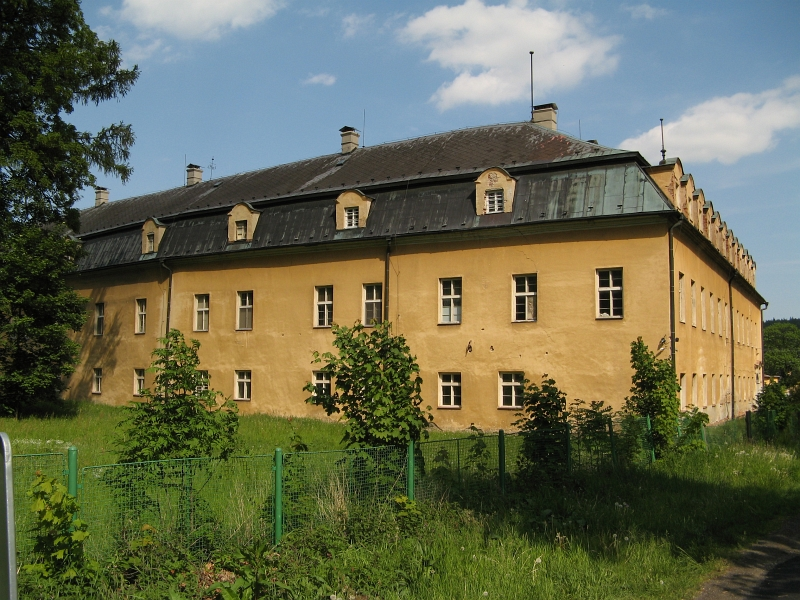
- Hošťálkovy Castle

- Flag Coat of arms

- Location in the Czech Republic
- Coordinates: 50°6′42″N 17°35′59″E
- Country: Czech Republic
- Region: Moravian-Silesian
- District: Bruntál
- First mentioned: 1281

Area
  - Total: 27.79 km^{2} (10.73 sq mi)
- Elevation: 400 m (1,300 ft)

Population (2026-01-01)
  - Total: 633
  - Density: 22.8/km^{2} (59.0/sq mi)
- Time zone: UTC+1 (CET)
  - Summer (DST): UTC+2 (CEST)
- Postal code: 794 01
- Website: www.hostalkovy.cz

Hošťálkovy (German: Gotschdorf) is a municipality and village in Bruntál District in the Moravian-Silesian Region of the Czech Republic. It has about 600 inhabitants.

== Administrative division ==
Hošťálkovy consists of four municipal parts (in brackets population according to the 2021 census):

- Hošťálkovy (303)
- Křížová (28)
- Staré Purkartice (69)
- Vraclávek (183)

== History ==
The first written mention of Hošťálkovy is from 1281.

== Demographics ==
Historical population
Year	Pop.	±%
1869	1,996	—
1880	1,794	−10.1%
1890	1,750	−2.5%
1900	1,600	−8.6%
1910	1,573	−1.7%
1921	1,530	−2.7%
1930	1,492	−2.5%
1950	493	−67.0%
1961	934	+89.5%
1970	738	−21.0%
1980	733	−0.7%
1991	698	−4.8%
2001	677	−3.0%
2011	552	−18.5%
2021	583	+5.6%
Source: Censuses
