= Brantice =

- Municipality
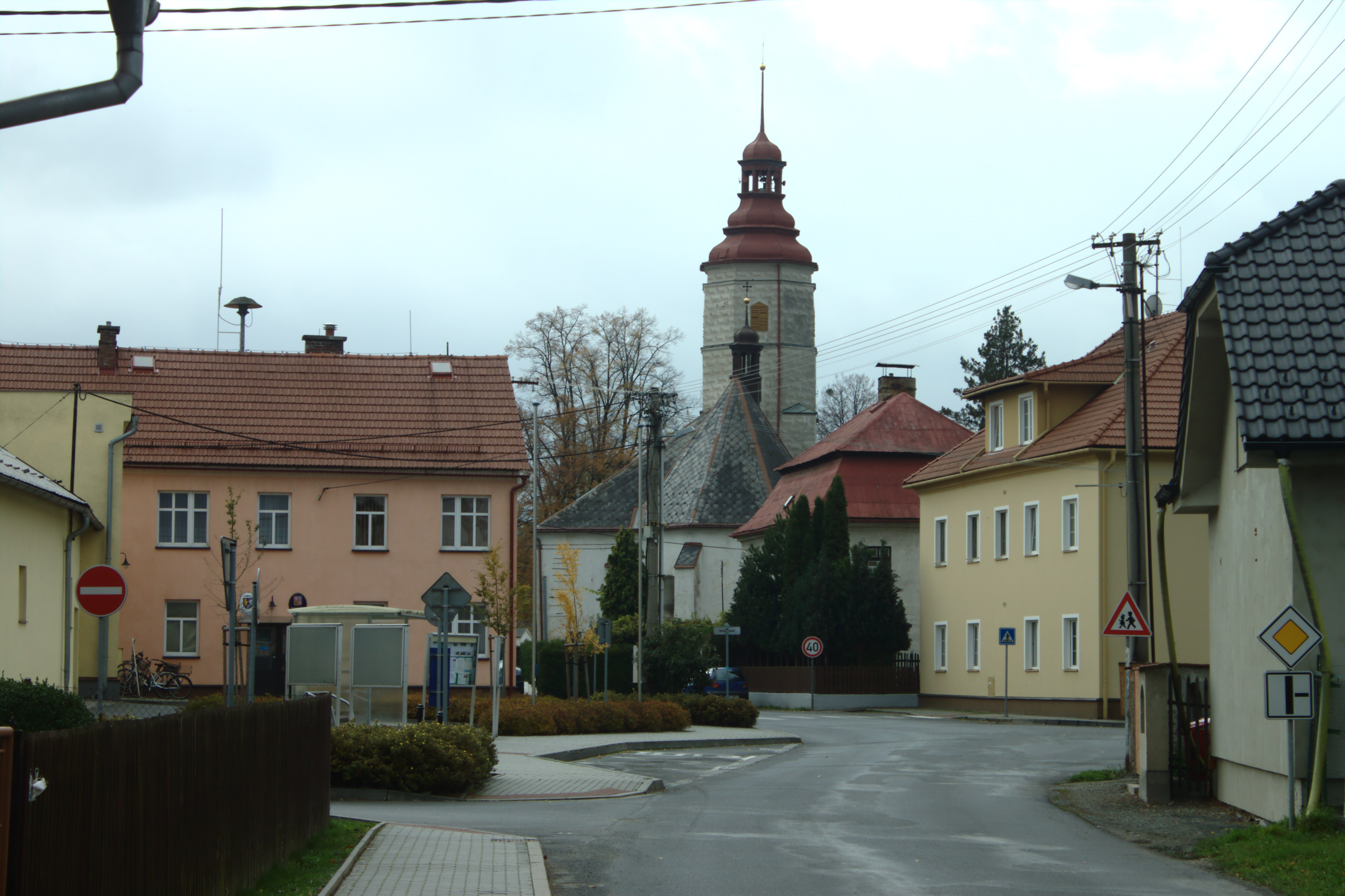
- Centre of Brantice

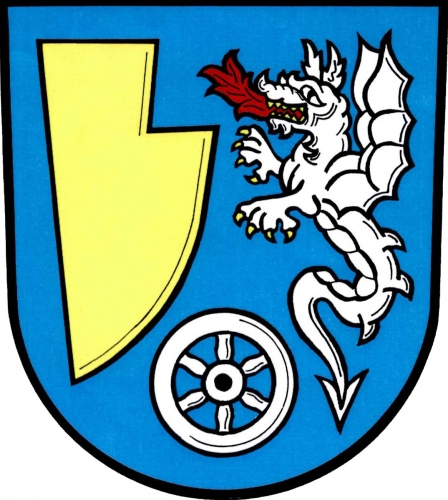
- Flag Coat of arms

- Location in the Czech Republic
- Coordinates: 50°3′49″N 17°37′45″E
- Country: Czech Republic
- Region: Moravian-Silesian
- District: Bruntál
- First mentioned: 1222

Area
  - Total: 26.73 km^{2} (10.32 sq mi)
- Elevation: 341 m (1,119 ft)

Population (2026-01-01)
  - Total: 1,401
  - Density: 52.41/km^{2} (135.7/sq mi)
- Time zone: UTC+1 (CET)
  - Summer (DST): UTC+2 (CEST)
- Postal code: 793 93
- Website: www.brantice.cz

Brantice (German: Bransdorf) is a municipality and village in Bruntál District in the Moravian-Silesian Region of the Czech Republic. It has about 1,400 inhabitants.

== Administrative division ==
Brantice consists of two municipal parts (in brackets population according to the 2021 census):

- Brantice (1,117)
- Radim (219)

== Geography ==
Brantice is located about 14 kilometres (9 mi) northeast of Bruntál and 50 km (31 mi) northwest of Ostrava. It lies in the Nízký Jeseník range. The highest point is the hill Uhlák at 667 m (2,188 ft) above sea level. The built-up area lies in the valley of the Opava River.

== History ==
The first written mention of Brantice is from 1222. In 1377, it became a part of the Duchy of Krnov. From 1485, the village of Radim belonged to the Brantice estate. As a result of wars in the 15th and 17th centuries, the depopulated Brantice was settled by German immigrants, who gradually formed the majority here. In 1945, the German-speaking inhabitants were expelled.

== Demographics ==
Historical population

Year	Pop.	±%
1869	1,659	—
1880	1,726	+4.0%
1890	1,759	+1.9%
1900	1,598	−9.2%
1910	1,716	+7.4%

Year	Pop.	±%
1921	1,807	+5.3%
1930	2,120	+17.3%
1950	1,376	−35.1%
1961	1,467	+6.6%
1970	1,394	−5.0%

Year	Pop.	±%
1980	1,200	−13.9%
1991	1,110	−7.5%
2001	1,174	+5.8%
2011	1,257	+7.1%
2021	1,336	+6.3%

Source: Censuses

== Transport ==
The I/45 road (the section from Bruntál to Krnov) runs through the municipality.

Brantice is located on the railway line Ostrava–Moravský Beroun via Bruntál.

== Sights ==
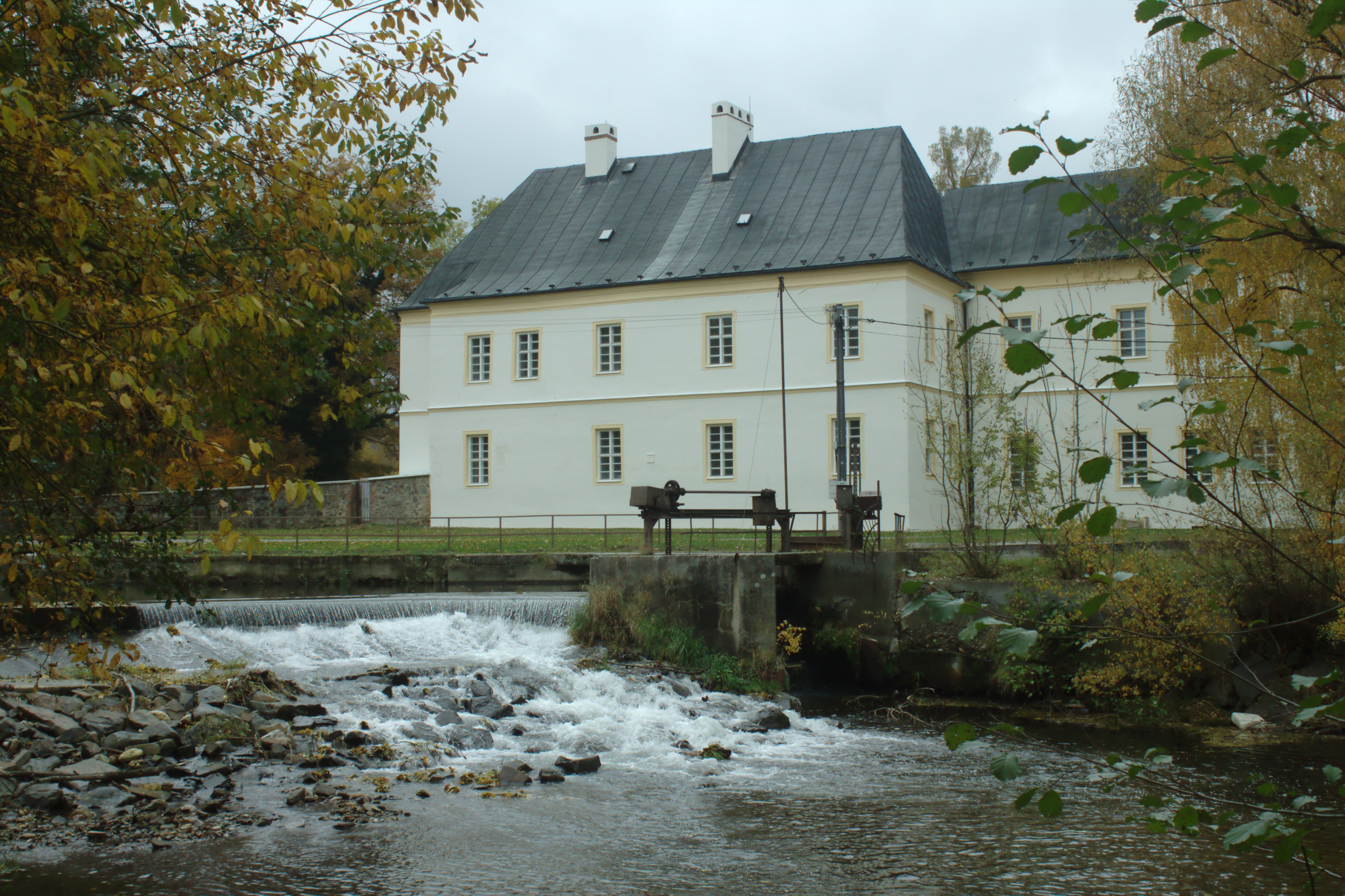
Brantice Castle

The main landmark of Brantice is the Church of the Assumption of the Virgin Mary. It is a Renaissance-Baroque building with preserved sgraffito decoration on the tower.

The Brantice Castle is a rural castle with a park. It was gradually built on the site of an older fortress in the period from the 1670s to the beginning of the 19th century. Today it is privately owned and inaccessible.
