= Staré Město (Bruntál District) =

- Municipality
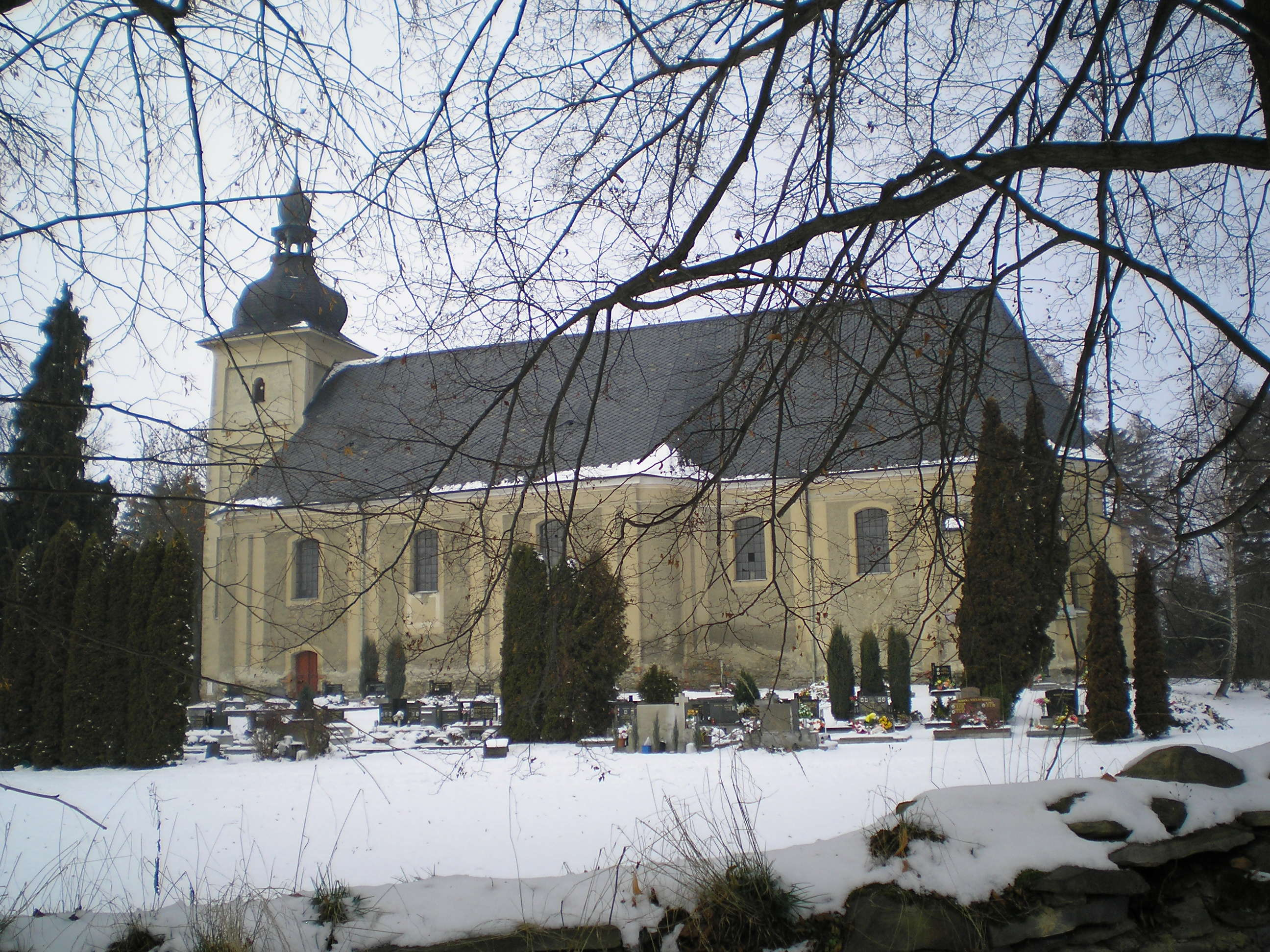
- Church of the Immaculate Conception

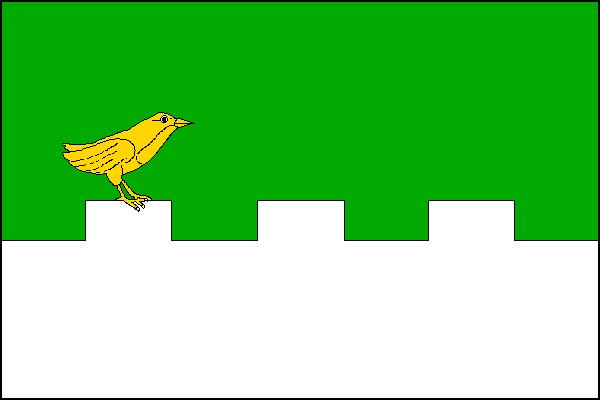
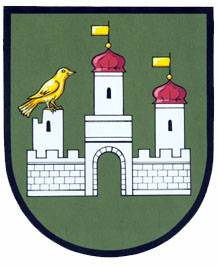
- Flag Coat of arms

- Location in the Czech Republic
- Coordinates: 50°0′13″N 17°25′56″E
- Country: Czech Republic
- Region: Moravian-Silesian
- District: Bruntál
- First mentioned: 1377

Area
  - Total: 24.25 km^{2} (9.36 sq mi)
- Elevation: 540 m (1,770 ft)

Population (2026-01-01)
  - Total: 913
  - Density: 37.6/km^{2} (97.5/sq mi)
- Time zone: UTC+1 (CET)
  - Summer (DST): UTC+2 (CEST)
- Postal code: 793 33
- Website: www.obecstaremesto.cz

Staré Město (Czech pronunciation: [ˈstarɛː ˈmɲɛsto]; German: Altstadt) is a municipality and village in Bruntál District in the Moravian-Silesian Region of the Czech Republic. It has about 900 inhabitants.

== Administrative division ==
Staré Město consists of two municipal parts (in brackets population according to the 2021 census):

- Staré Město (736)
- Nová Véska (107)

== History ==
The first written mention of Staré Město is from 1377.

== Demographics ==
Historical population
Year	Pop.	±%
1869	1,384	—
1880	1,501	+8.5%
1890	1,517	+1.1%
1900	1,413	−6.9%
1910	1,300	−8.0%
1921	1,325	+1.9%
1930	1,460	+10.2%
1950	752	−48.5%
1961	762	+1.3%
1970	680	−10.8%
1980	743	+9.3%
1991	647	−12.9%
2001	670	+3.6%
2011	811	+21.0%
2021	843	+3.9%
Source: Censuses
