= Tvrdkov =

- Municipality
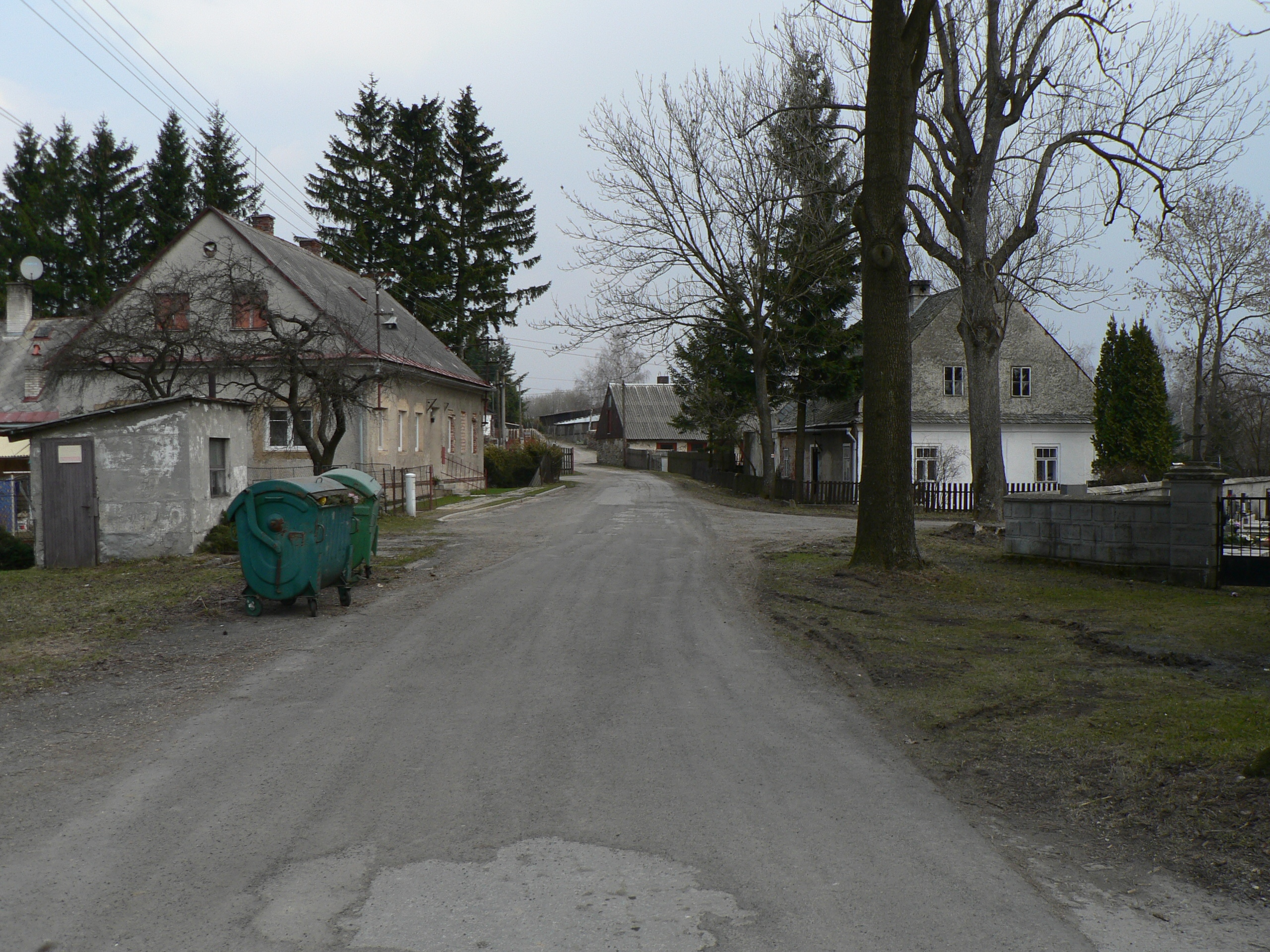
- Centre of Tvrdkov

- Coat of arms

- Location in the Czech Republic
- Coordinates: 49°53′44″N 17°10′41″E
- Country: Czech Republic
- Region: Moravian-Silesian
- District: Bruntál
- First mentioned: 1349

Area
  - Total: 19.89 km^{2} (7.68 sq mi)
- Elevation: 495 m (1,624 ft)

Population (2026-01-01)
  - Total: 244
  - Density: 12.3/km^{2} (31.8/sq mi)
- Time zone: UTC+1 (CET)
  - Summer (DST): UTC+2 (CEST)
- Postal code: 793 44
- Website: www.tvrdkov.cz

Tvrdkov (German: Pürkau) is a municipality and village in Bruntál District in the Moravian-Silesian Region of the Czech Republic. It has about 200 inhabitants.

== Administrative division ==
Tvrdkov consists of three municipal parts (in brackets population according to the 2021 census):

- Tvrdkov (127)
- Mirotínek (22)
- Ruda (78)

== Demographics ==
Historical population
Year	Pop.	±%
1869	1,647	—
1880	1,638	−0.5%
1890	1,524	−7.0%
1900	1,377	−9.6%
1910	1,302	−5.4%
1921	1,227	−5.8%
1930	1,148	−6.4%
1950	527	−54.1%
1961	571	+8.3%
1970	473	−17.2%
1980	346	−26.8%
1991	287	−17.1%
2001	253	−11.8%
2011	216	−14.6%
2021	227	+5.1%
Source: Censuses
