= Malá Štáhle =

- Municipality
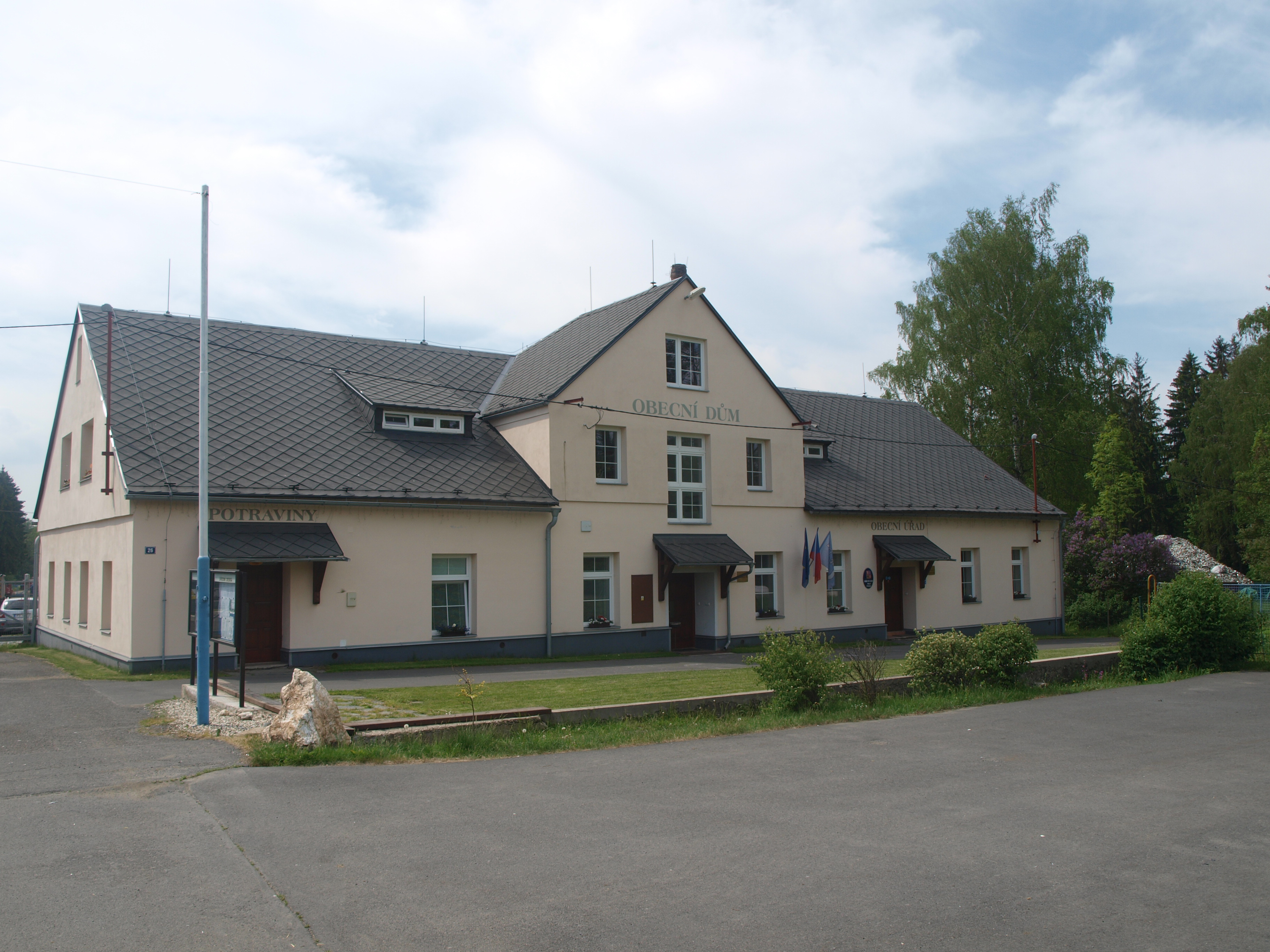
- Municipal office

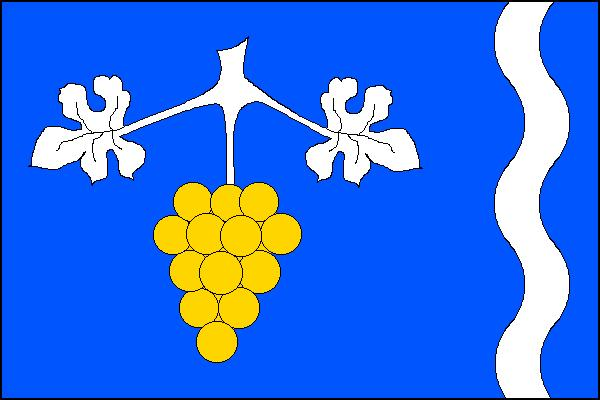
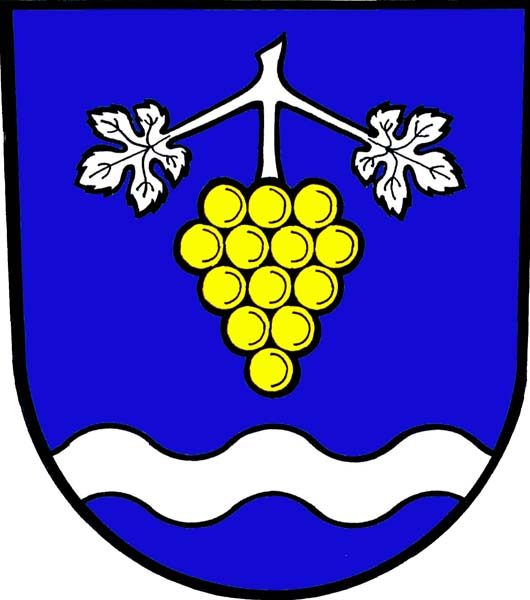
- Flag Coat of arms

- Location in the Czech Republic
- Coordinates: 49°57′5″N 17°20′29″E
- Country: Czech Republic
- Region: Moravian-Silesian
- District: Bruntál
- First mentioned: 1540

Area
  - Total: 2.81 km^{2} (1.08 sq mi)
- Elevation: 588 m (1,929 ft)

Population (2026-01-01)
  - Total: 109
  - Density: 38.8/km^{2} (100/sq mi)
- Time zone: UTC+1 (CET)
  - Summer (DST): UTC+2 (CEST)
- Postal code: 795 01
- Website: www.malastahle.cz

Malá Štáhle (German: Klein Stohl) is a municipality and village in Bruntál District in the Moravian-Silesian Region of the Czech Republic. It has about 100 inhabitants.

== Demographics ==
Historical population
Year	Pop.	±%
1869	174	—
1880	167	−4.0%
1890	145	−13.2%
1900	157	+8.3%
1910	193	+22.9%
1921	173	−10.4%
1930	160	−7.5%
1950	130	−18.8%
1961	169	+30.0%
1970	144	−14.8%
1980	162	+12.5%
1991	160	−1.2%
2001	142	−11.3%
2011	148	+4.2%
2021	113	−23.6%
Source: Censuses
