= Velká Štáhle =

- Municipality
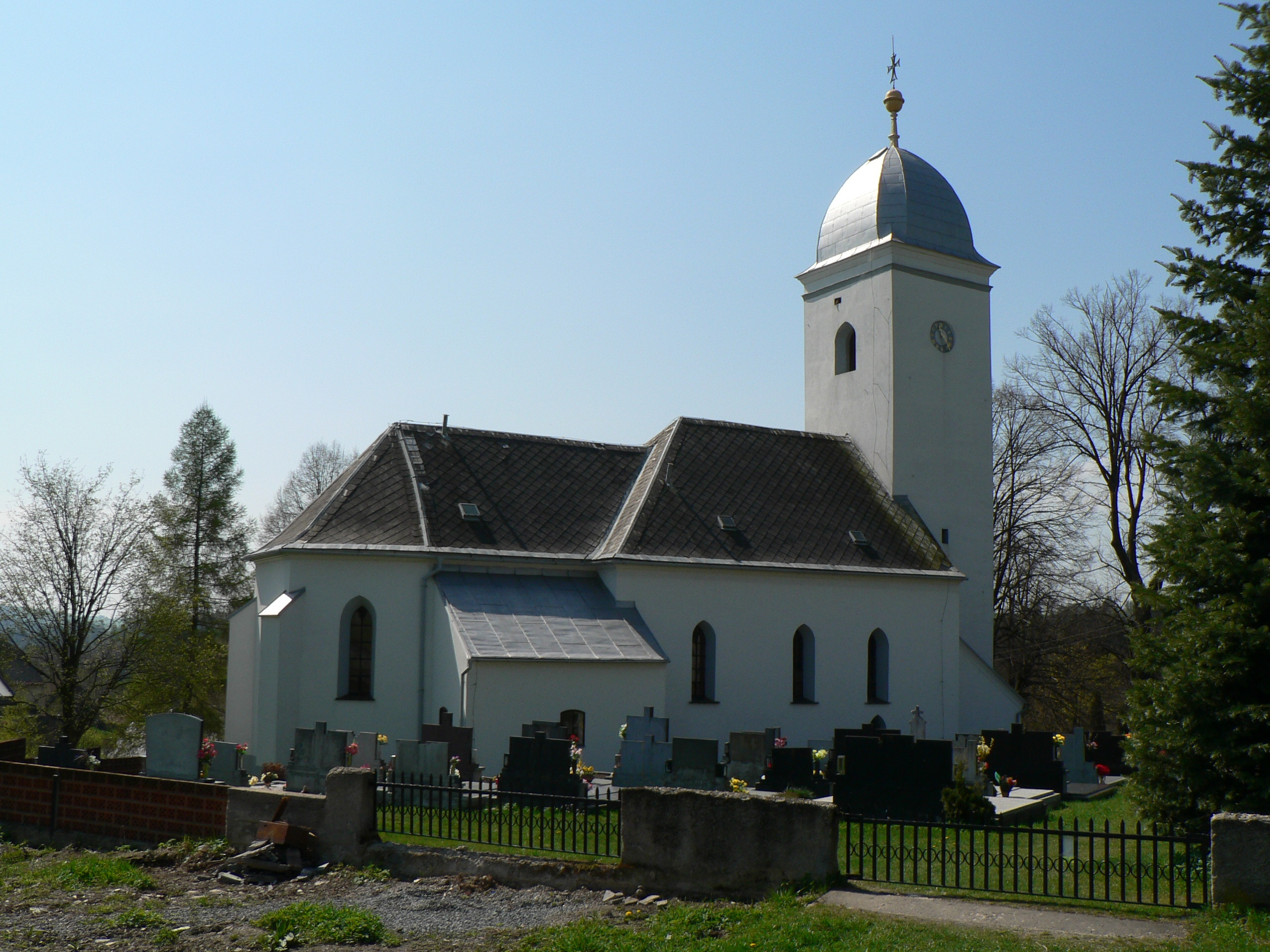
- Church of the Holy Trinity

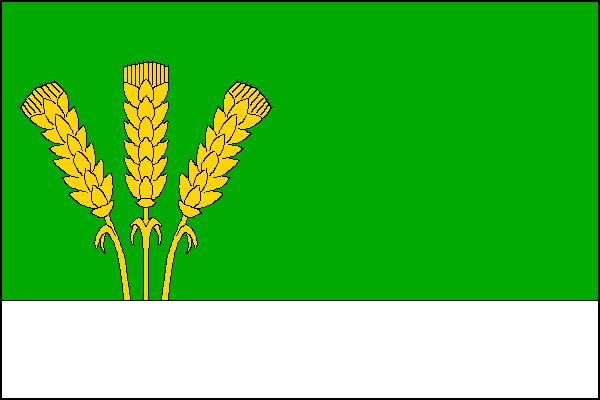
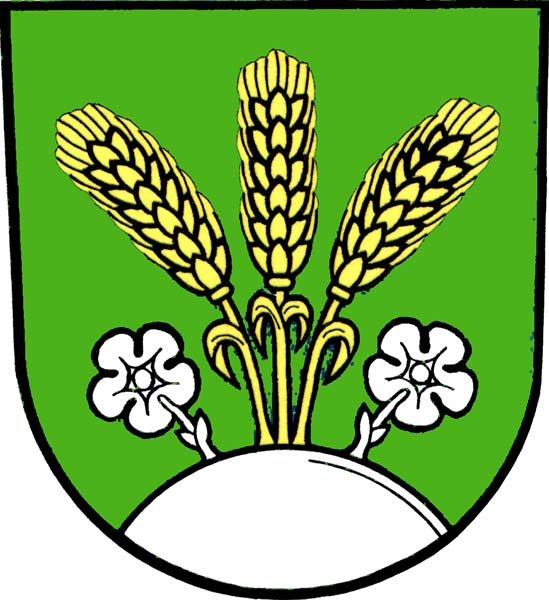
- Flag Coat of arms

- Location in the Czech Republic
- Coordinates: 49°55′47″N 17°21′25″E
- Country: Czech Republic
- Region: Moravian-Silesian
- District: Bruntál
- First mentioned: 1298

Area
  - Total: 9.55 km^{2} (3.69 sq mi)
- Elevation: 540 m (1,770 ft)

Population (2026-01-01)
  - Total: 330
  - Density: 35/km^{2} (89/sq mi)
- Time zone: UTC+1 (CET)
  - Summer (DST): UTC+2 (CEST)
- Postal code: 793 51
- Website: www.velkastahle.cz

Velká Štáhle (German: Gross Stohl) is a municipality and village in Bruntál District in the Moravian-Silesian Region of the Czech Republic. It has about 300 inhabitants.

== Demographics ==
Historical population
Year	Pop.	±%
1869	727	—
1880	703	−3.3%
1890	686	−2.4%
1900	669	−2.5%
1910	880	+31.5%
1921	722	−18.0%
1930	743	+2.9%
1950	612	−17.6%
1961	507	−17.2%
1970	474	−6.5%
1980	379	−20.0%
1991	329	−13.2%
2001	334	+1.5%
2011	342	+2.4%
2021	316	−7.6%
Source: Censuses
