= Staré Heřminovy =

- Municipality
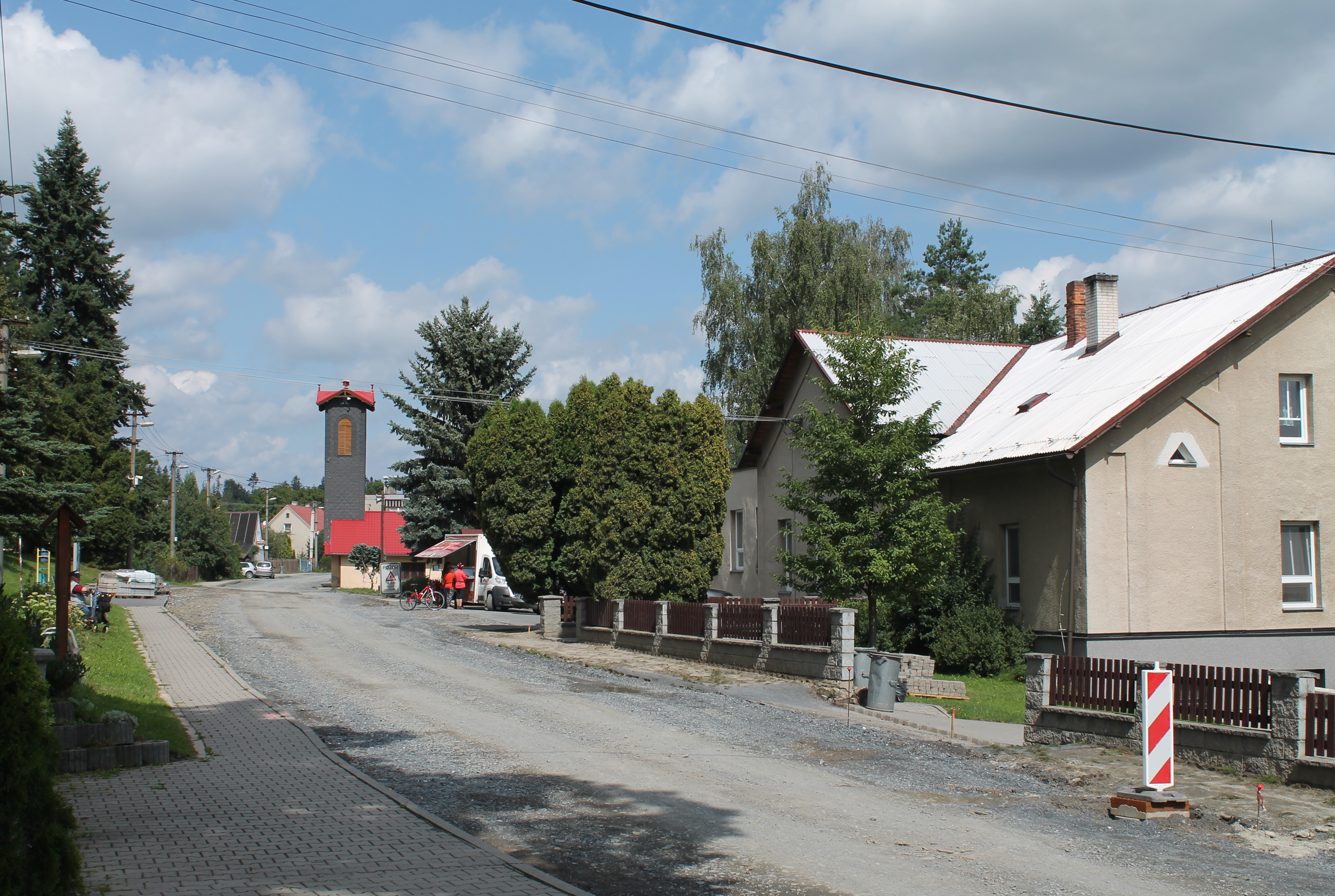
- Centre of Staré Heřminovy

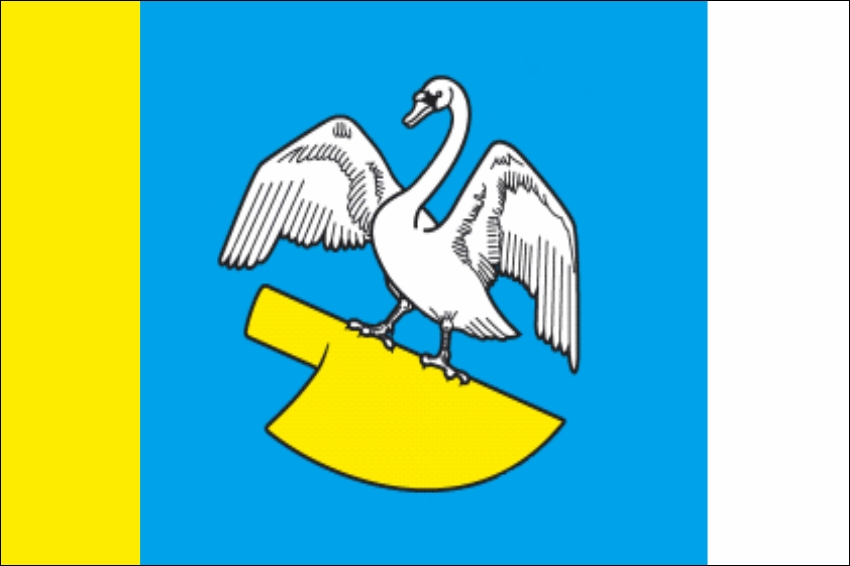
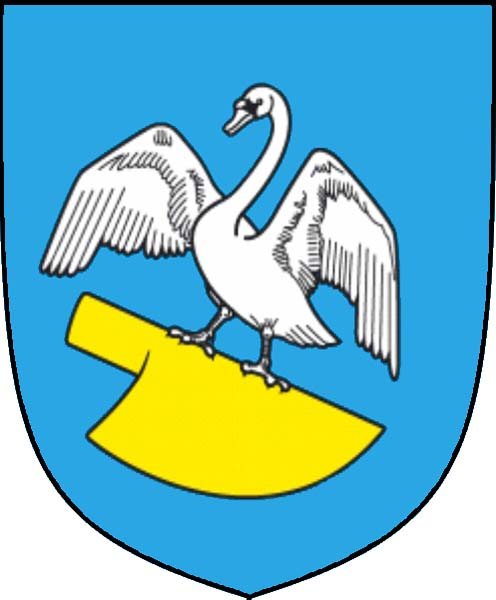
- Flag Coat of arms

- Location in the Czech Republic
- Coordinates: 49°55′59″N 17°37′33″E
- Country: Czech Republic
- Region: Moravian-Silesian
- District: Bruntál
- First mentioned: 1338

Area
  - Total: 10.21 km^{2} (3.94 sq mi)
- Elevation: 473 m (1,552 ft)

Population (2026-01-01)
  - Total: 217
  - Density: 21.3/km^{2} (55.0/sq mi)
- Time zone: UTC+1 (CET)
  - Summer (DST): UTC+2 (CEST)
- Postal code: 793 12
- Website: www.stare-herminovy.eu

Staré Heřminovy (German: Alt Erbersdorf) is a municipality and village in Bruntál District in the Moravian-Silesian Region of the Czech Republic. It has about 200 inhabitants.

== Demographics ==
Historical population
Year	Pop.	±%
1869	561	—
1880	539	−3.9%
1890	575	+6.7%
1900	602	+4.7%
1910	600	−0.3%
1921	555	−7.5%
1930	536	−3.4%
1950	367	−31.5%
1961	310	−15.5%
1970	335	+8.1%
1980	315	−6.0%
1991	262	−16.8%
2001	238	−9.2%
2011	236	−0.8%
2021	190	−19.5%
Source: Censuses
