= Moravskoslezský Kočov =

- Municipality
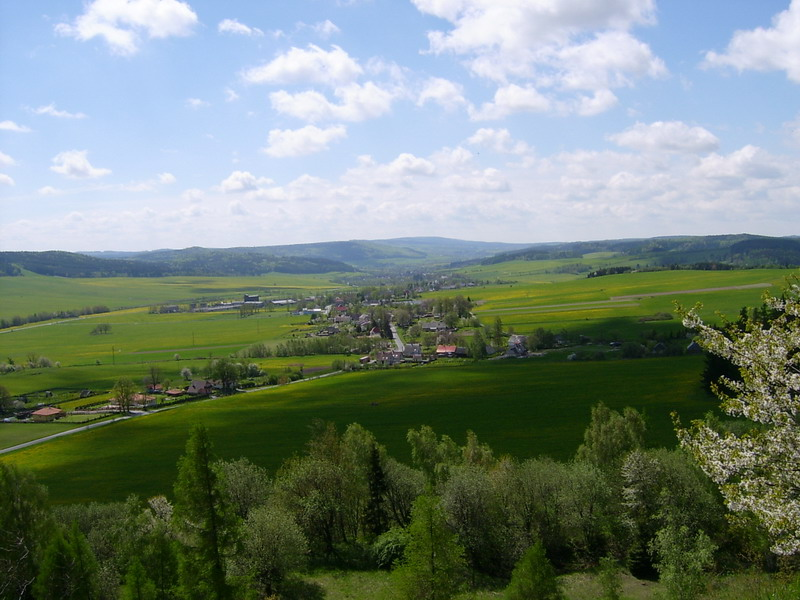
- General view

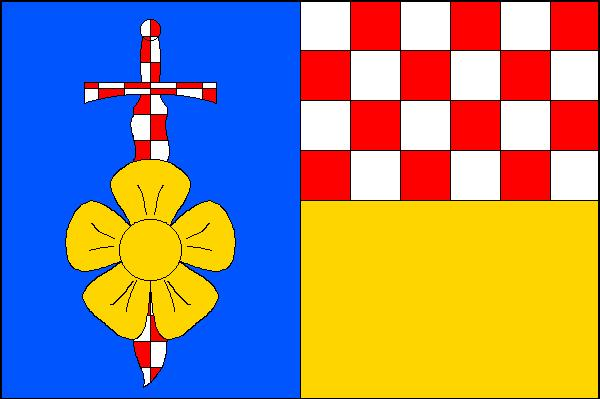
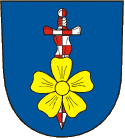
- Flag Coat of arms

- Location in the Czech Republic
- Coordinates: 49°57′11″N 17°26′18″E
- Country: Czech Republic
- Region: Moravian-Silesian
- District: Bruntál
- First mentioned: 1405

Area
  - Total: 14.98 km^{2} (5.78 sq mi)
- Elevation: 565 m (1,854 ft)

Population (2026-01-01)
  - Total: 601
  - Density: 40.1/km^{2} (104/sq mi)
- Time zone: UTC+1 (CET)
  - Summer (DST): UTC+2 (CEST)
- Postal code: 792 01
- Website: www.mskocov.cz

Moravskoslezský Kočov (German: Mährisch und Schlesisch Kotzendorf) is a municipality in Bruntál District in the Moravian-Silesian Region of the Czech Republic. It has about 600 inhabitants.

== Administrative division ==
Moravskoslezský Kočov consists of two municipal parts (in brackets population according to the 2021 census):

- Moravský Kočov (437)
- Slezský Kočov (120)

== Demographics ==
Historical population
Year	Pop.	±%
1869	1,141	—
1880	1,068	−6.4%
1890	1,143	+7.0%
1900	1,026	−10.2%
1910	879	−14.3%
1921	817	−7.1%
1930	787	−3.7%
1950	436	−44.6%
1961	415	−4.8%
1970	422	+1.7%
1980	373	−11.6%
1991	397	+6.4%
2001	455	+14.6%
2011	520	+14.3%
2021	557	+7.1%
Source: Censuses
