= Čaková =

- Municipality
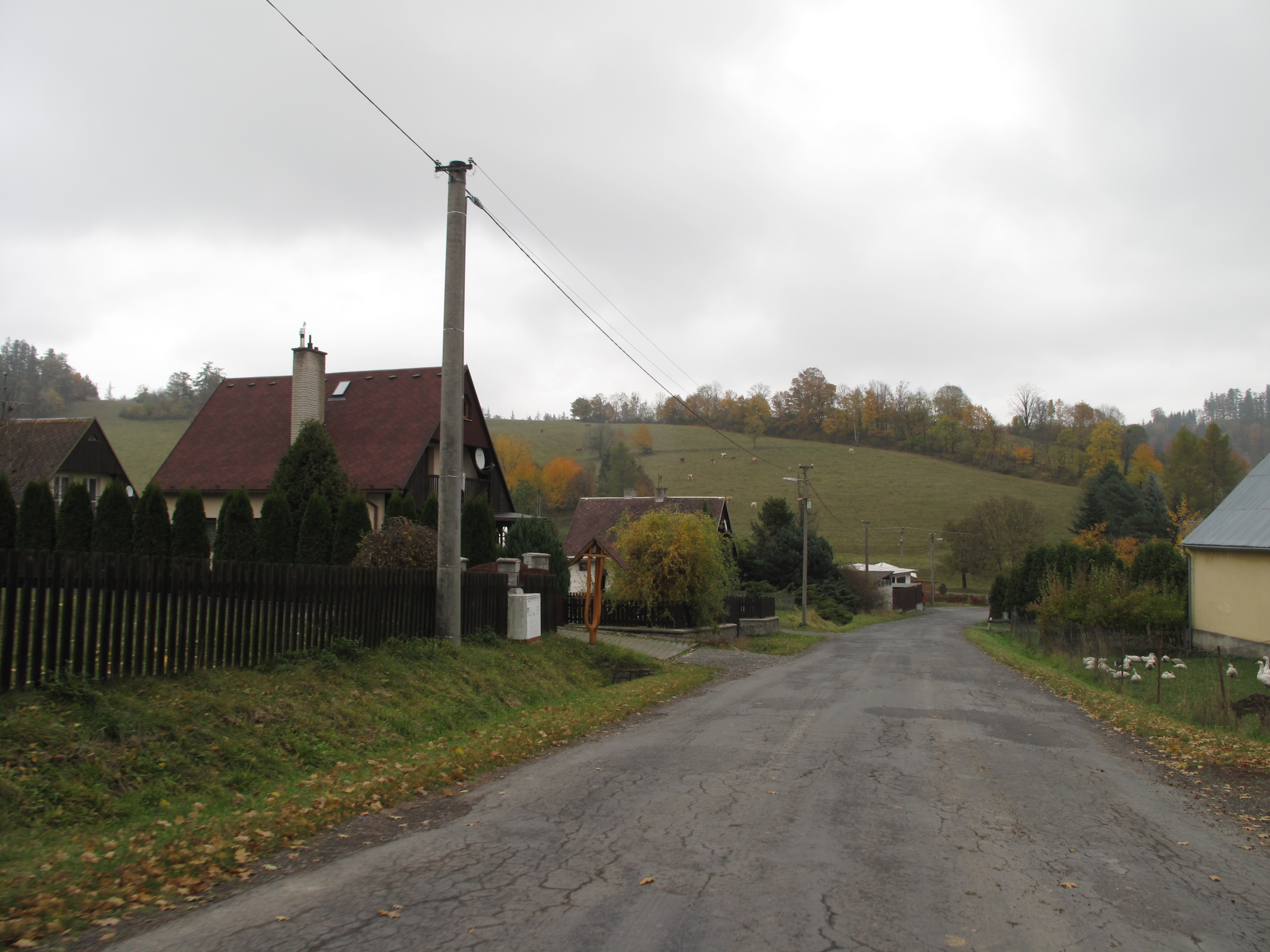
- A street in Čaková

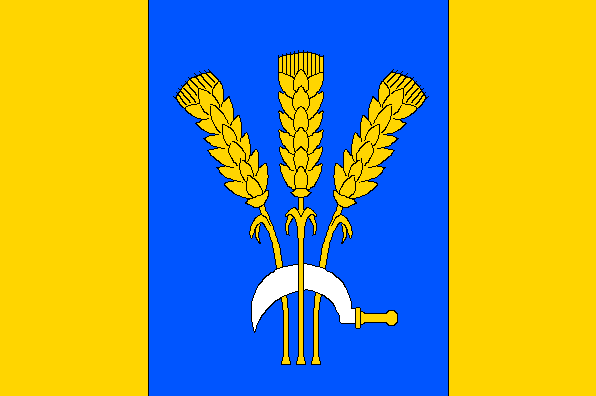
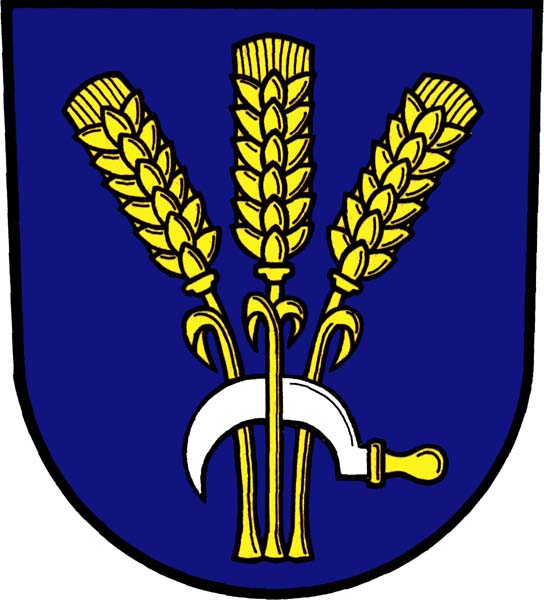
- Flag Coat of arms

- Location in the Czech Republic
- Coordinates: 50°3′0″N 17°32′54″E
- Country: Czech Republic
- Region: Moravian-Silesian
- District: Bruntál
- First mentioned: 1498

Area
  - Total: 11.93 km^{2} (4.61 sq mi)
- Elevation: 515 m (1,690 ft)

Population (2026-01-01)
  - Total: 348
  - Density: 29.2/km^{2} (75.6/sq mi)
- Time zone: UTC+1 (CET)
  - Summer (DST): UTC+2 (CEST)
- Postal code: 793 16
- Website: www.cakova.cz

Čaková (German: Friedersdorf) is a municipality and village in Bruntál District in the Moravian-Silesian Region of the Czech Republic. It has about 300 inhabitants.

== Demographics ==
Historical population
Year	Pop.	±%
1869	663	—
1880	701	+5.7%
1890	746	+6.4%
1900	627	−16.0%
1910	670	+6.9%
1921	634	−5.4%
1930	701	+10.6%
1950	413	−41.1%
1961	427	+3.4%
1970	365	−14.5%
1980	343	−6.0%
1991	286	−16.6%
2001	294	+2.8%
2011	291	−1.0%
2021	300	+3.1%
Source: Censuses
