= Bruntál District =

Bruntál District Okres Bruntál
- District
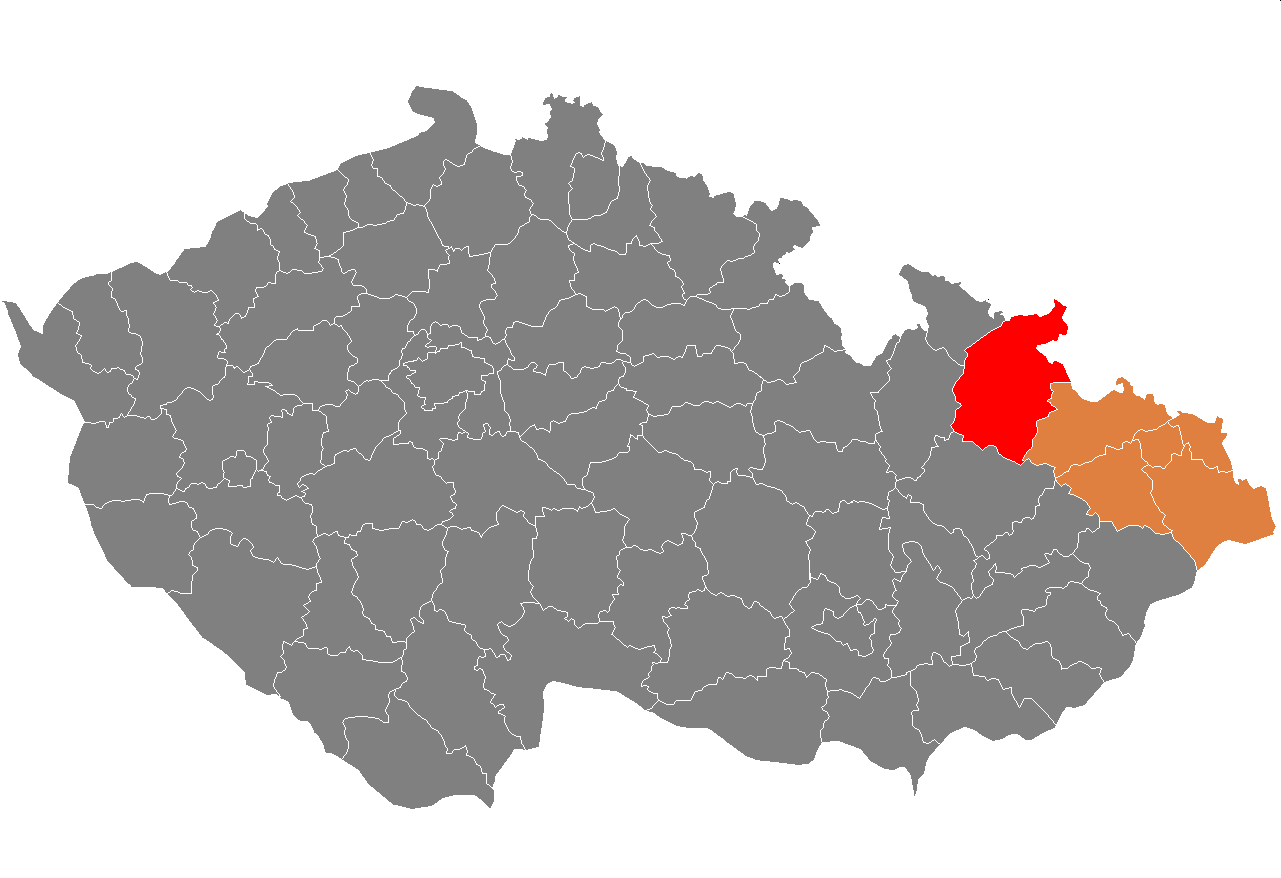
- Location in the Moravian-Silesian Region within the Czech Republic
- Coordinates: 50°3′N 17°26′E
- Country: Czech Republic
- Region: Moravian-Silesian
- Capital: Bruntál

Area
  - Total: 1,536.65 km^{2} (593.30 sq mi)

Population (2026)
  - Total: 87,396
  - Density: 56.874/km^{2} (147.30/sq mi)
- Time zone: UTC+1 (CET)
  - Summer (DST): UTC+2 (CEST)
- Municipalities: 67
- * Towns: 9
- * Market towns: 0

Bruntál District (Czech: okres Bruntál) is a district in the Moravian-Silesian Region of the Czech Republic. Its capital is the town of Bruntál, but the most populous town is Krnov.

== Administrative division ==
Bruntál District is divided into three administrative districts of municipalities with extended competence: Bruntál, Krnov and Rýmařov.

=== List of municipalities ===
Towns are marked in bold:

Andělská Hora – Bílčice – Bohušov – Brantice – Břidličná – Bruntál – Býkov-Láryšov – Čaková – Dětřichov nad Bystřicí – Dívčí Hrad – Dlouhá Stráň – Dolní Moravice – Dvorce – Heřmanovice – Hlinka – Holčovice – Horní Benešov – Horní Město – Horní Životice – Hošťálkovy – Janov – Jindřichov – Jiříkov – Karlova Studánka – Karlovice – Krasov – Křišťanovice – Krnov – Leskovec nad Moravicí – Lichnov – Liptaň – Lomnice – Ludvíkov – Malá Morávka – Malá Štáhle – Město Albrechtice – Mezina – Milotice nad Opavou – Moravskoslezský Kočov – Nová Pláň – Nové Heřminovy – Oborná – Osoblaha – Petrovice – Razová – Roudno – Rudná pod Pradědem – Rusín – Rýmařov – Ryžoviště – Široká Niva – Slezské Pavlovice – Slezské Rudoltice – Stará Ves – Staré Heřminovy – Staré Město – Světlá Hora – Svobodné Heřmanice – Třemešná – Tvrdkov – Úvalno – Václavov u Bruntálu – Valšov – Velká Štáhle – Vrbno pod Pradědem – Vysoká – Zátor

== Geography ==
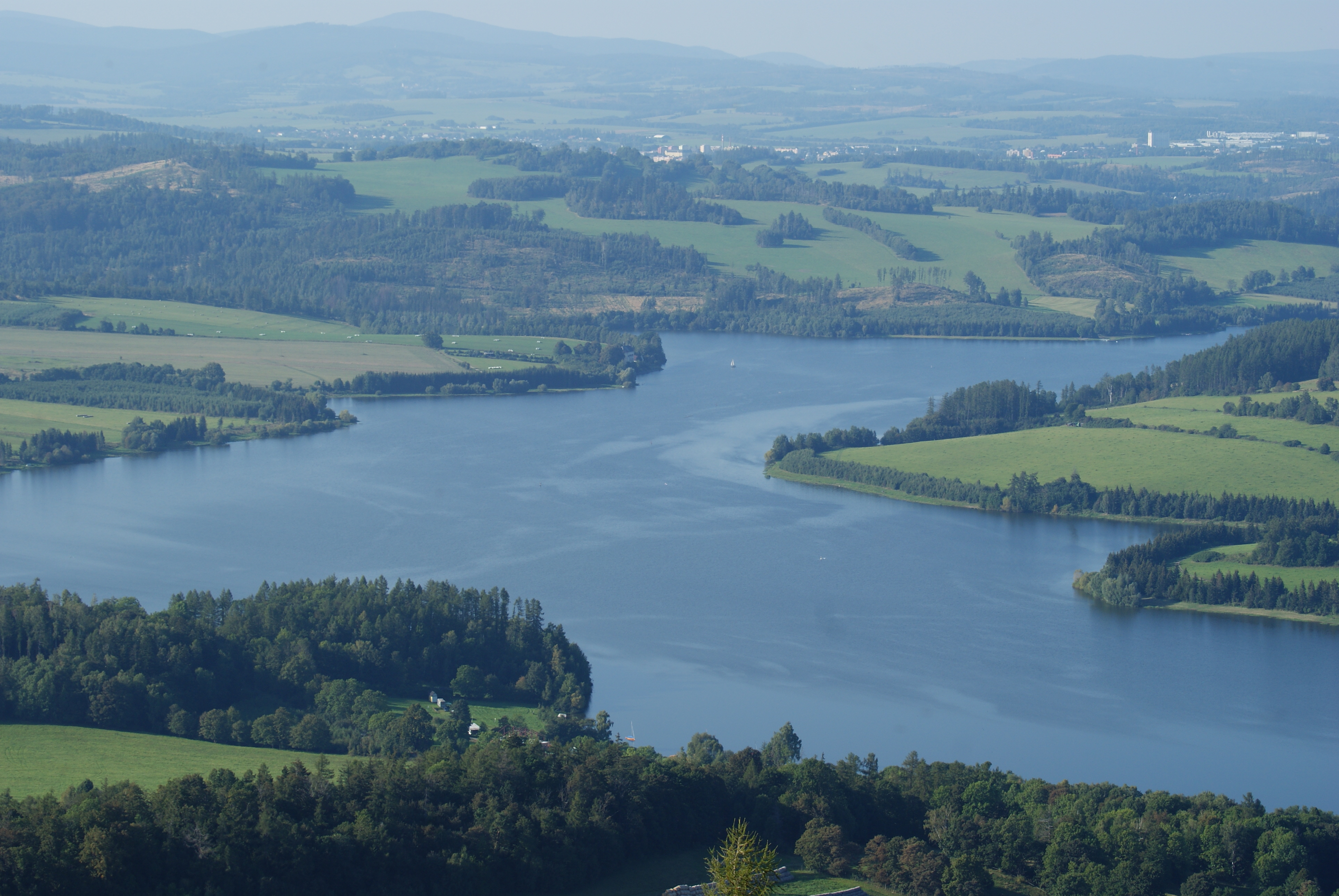
Slezská Harta Reservoir

Bruntál District borders Poland in the north. The terrain is mostly fragmented and hilly, and in the west it turns into mountains. The territory extends into four geomorphological mesoregions: Nízký Jeseník (most of the district), Hrubý Jeseník (west), Zlatohorská Highlands (north), and Opava Hilly Land (small parts in north and east). The highest point of the district and of the entire Moravian-Silesian Region is the mountain Praděd in Malá Morávka with an elevation of 1,491 m (4,892 ft). The lowest point of the district is the river bed of the Osobloga in Osoblaha at 205 m (673 ft).

From the total district area of 1,536.7 km^{2} (593.3 sq mi), agricultural land occupies 704.3 km^{2} (271.9 sq mi), forests occupy 706.3 km^{2} (272.7 sq mi), and water area occupies 21.0 km^{2} (8.1 sq mi). Forests cover 46.0% of the district's area.

The most important rivers are the Opava, which originates here and flows through the centre of the district to the east, and the Moravice, which also originates here, flows through the southern part of the district, and later joins the Opava. An important tributary of the Opava in the district is the Opavice. The northern part of the district is drained by the Osoblaha. The Bystřice originates in the southern part of the district, but soon leaves the district. Overall, the area is poor in bodies of water, but there is Slezská Harta Reservoir, one of the largest reservoirs in the country with an area of 8.7 km^{2} (3.4 sq mi).

The western part of the territory is protected as the Jeseníky Protected Landscape Area.

== Demographics ==
Historical population

Year	Pop.	±%
1869	142,980	—
1880	147,055	+2.9%
1890	146,411	−0.4%
1900	140,407	−4.1%
1910	140,108	−0.2%

Year	Pop.	±%
1921	132,381	−5.5%
1930	140,017	+5.8%
1950	82,412	−41.1%
1961	89,798	+9.0%
1970	91,436	+1.8%

Year	Pop.	±%
1980	99,381	+8.7%
1991	99,461	+0.1%
2001	100,272	+0.8%
2011	92,693	−7.6%
2021	86,215	−7.0%

Source: Censuses

=== Most populous municipalities ===
Name	Population	Area (km^{2})
Krnov	22,303	44
Bruntál	14,791	29
Rýmařov	7,670	61
Vrbno pod Pradědem	4,627	69
Město Albrechtice	3,338	65
Břidličná	2,843	26
Horní Benešov	2,214	20
Brantice	1,401	27
Světlá Hora	1,337	43
Dvorce	1,212	24

== Economy ==
The largest employers with headquarters in Bruntál District and at least 500 employees are:

Economic entity	Location	Number of employees	Main activity
Sdružené zdravotnické zařízení Krnov	Krnov	1,000–1,499	Health care
AL Invest Břidličná	Břidličná	500–999	Manufacture of aluminium products
Kofola	Krnov	500–999	Manufacture of beverages
UGO trade	Krnov	500–999	Mobile food service activities
Husqvarna Manufacturing CZ	Vrbno pod Pradědem	500–999	Manufacture of power-driven hand tools

== Transport ==
There are no motorways passing through the district. The most important roads are the I/11 from Opava to Šumperk and the I/45 from Bruntál to Krnov and the Czech–Polish border.

== Sights ==
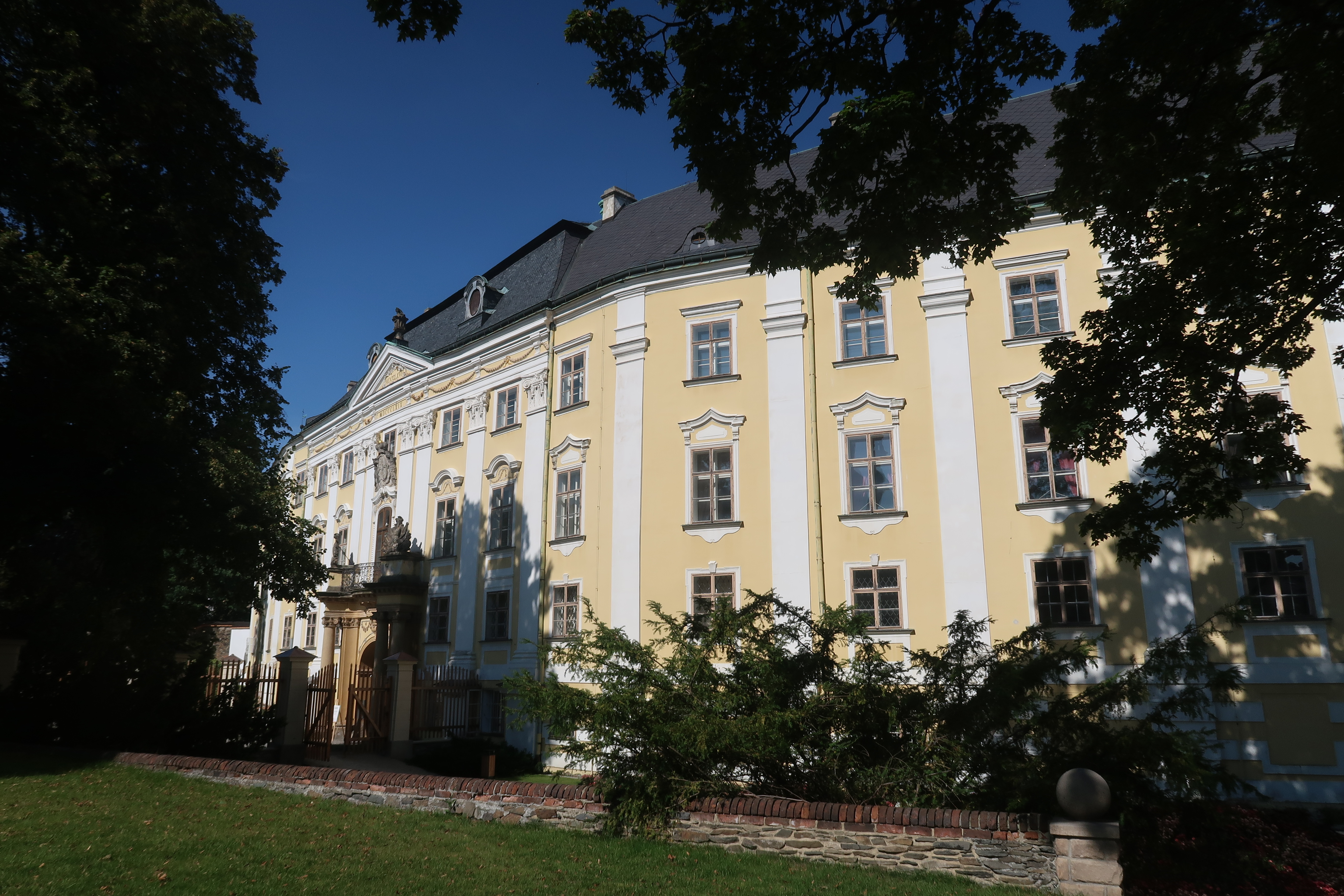
Bruntál Castle

The most important monuments in the district, protected as national cultural monuments, are:

- Bruntál Castle
- Cotton mill and warehouse of the Alois Larisch factory in Krnov with a sample workshop, including a set of machinery
- Scythe manufactory in Karlovice (Bruntál District)
- Pilgrimage area with the Church of Our Lady of Seven Sorrows and the Exaltation of the Holy Cross in Krnov
- Stations of the Cross and Church of Our Lady of the Snows in Ruda

The best-preserved settlements, protected as monument reservations and monument zones, are:

- Heřmanovice (monument reservation)
- Bruntál
- Rýmařov
- Karlova Studánka
- Malá Morávka
- Petrovice
- Piskořov
- Žďárský Potok

The most visited tourist destination is the Sovinec Castle.
