= Křišťanovice =

- Municipality
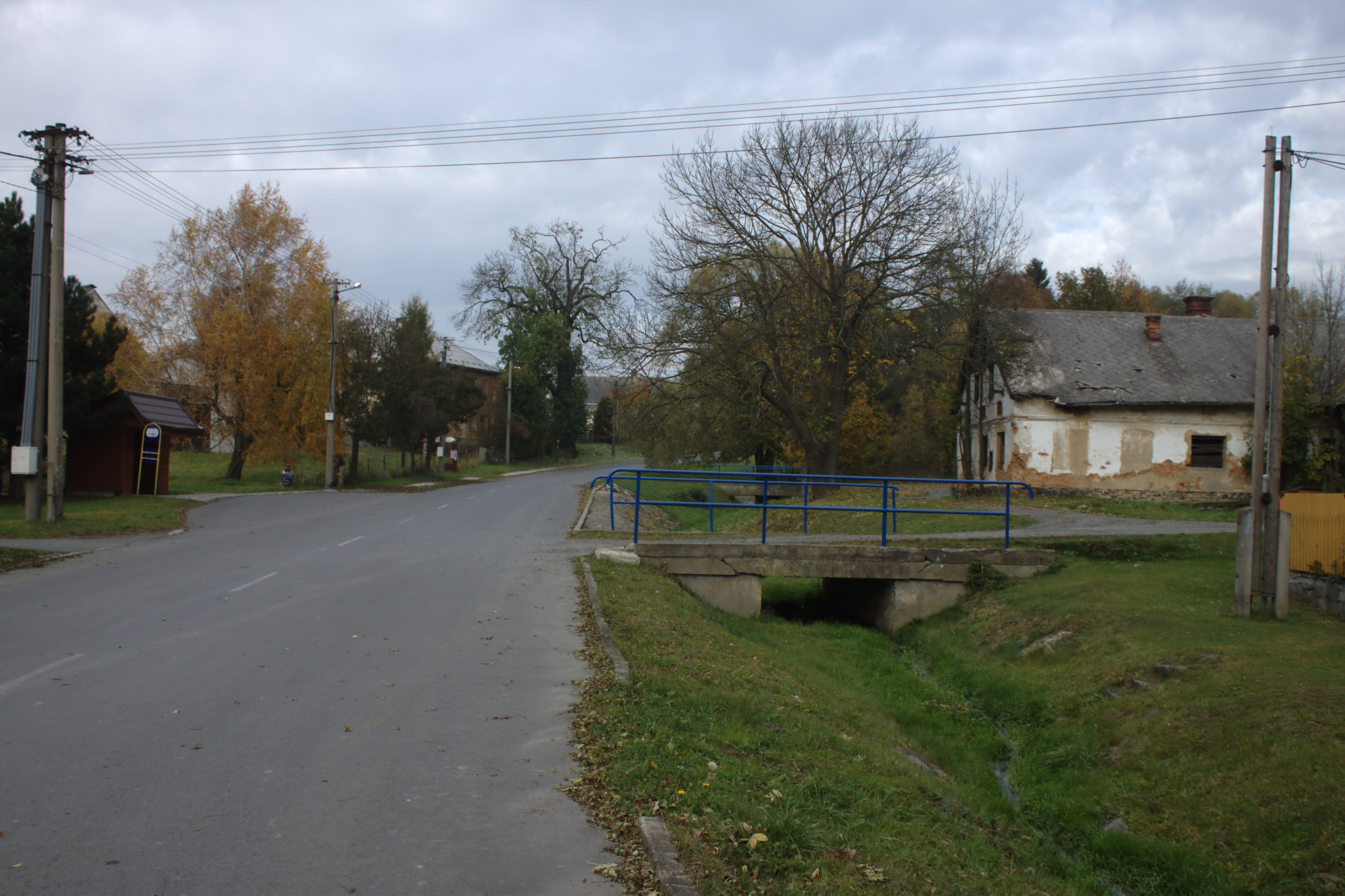
- Main street

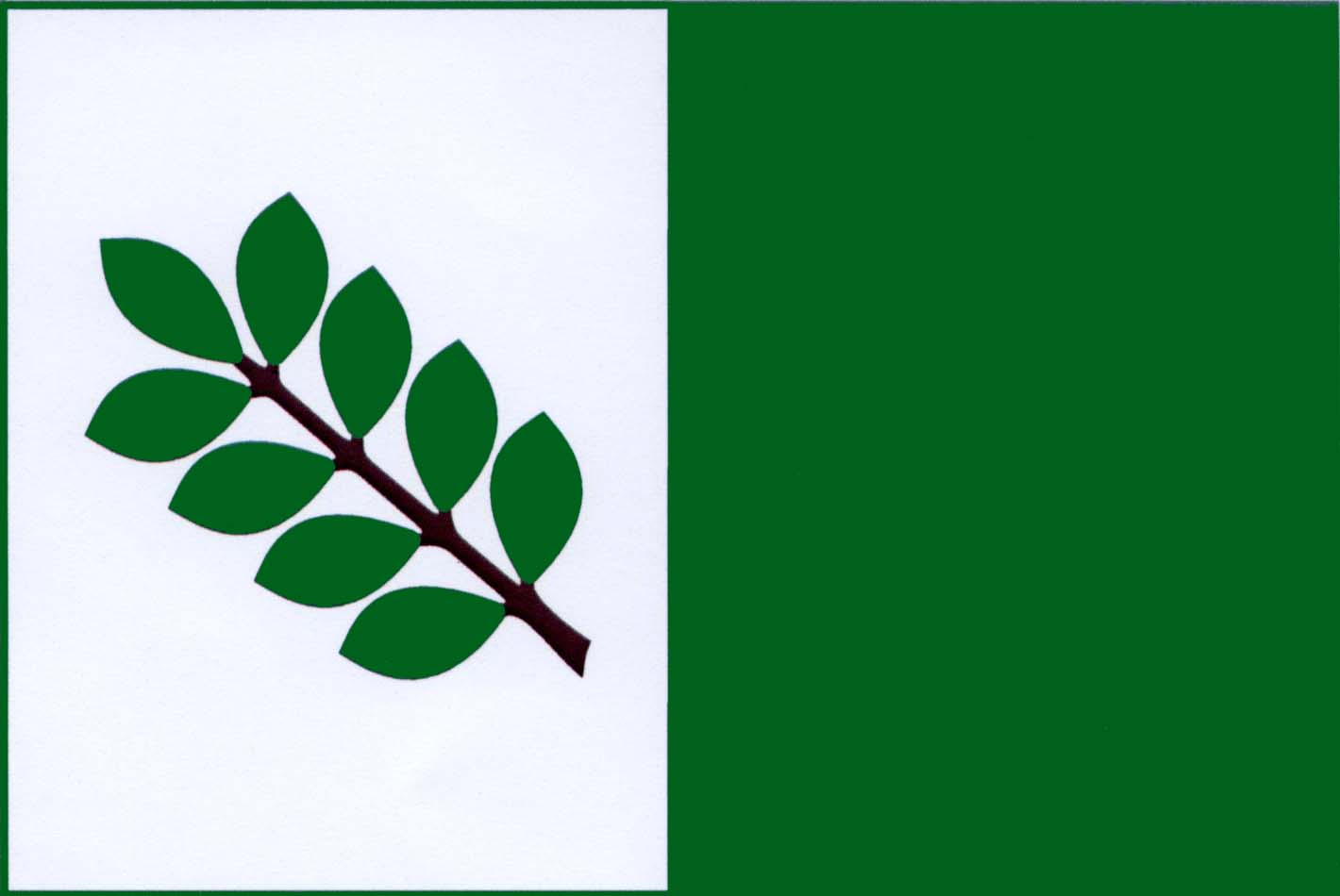
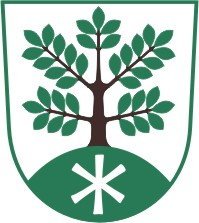
- Flag Coat of arms

- Location in the Czech Republic
- Coordinates: 49°51′3″N 17°30′40″E
- Country: Czech Republic
- Region: Moravian-Silesian
- District: Bruntál
- First mentioned: 1397

Area
  - Total: 16.21 km^{2} (6.26 sq mi)
- Elevation: 605 m (1,985 ft)

Population (2026-01-01)
  - Total: 220
  - Density: 14/km^{2} (35/sq mi)
- Time zone: UTC+1 (CET)
  - Summer (DST): UTC+2 (CEST)
- Postal code: 793 68
- Website: www.kristanovice.cz

Křišťanovice (German: Christdorf) is a municipality and village in Bruntál District in the Moravian-Silesian Region of the Czech Republic. It has about 200 inhabitants.

== Demographics ==
Historical population
Year	Pop.	±%
1869	606	—
1880	734	+21.1%
1890	705	−4.0%
1900	664	−5.8%
1910	668	+0.6%
1921	589	−11.8%
1930	562	−4.6%
1950	242	−56.9%
1961	360	+48.8%
1970	306	−15.0%
1980	276	−9.8%
1991	322	+16.7%
2001	317	−1.6%
2011	235	−25.9%
2021	221	−6.0%
Source: Censuses
