= Mezina =

- Municipality
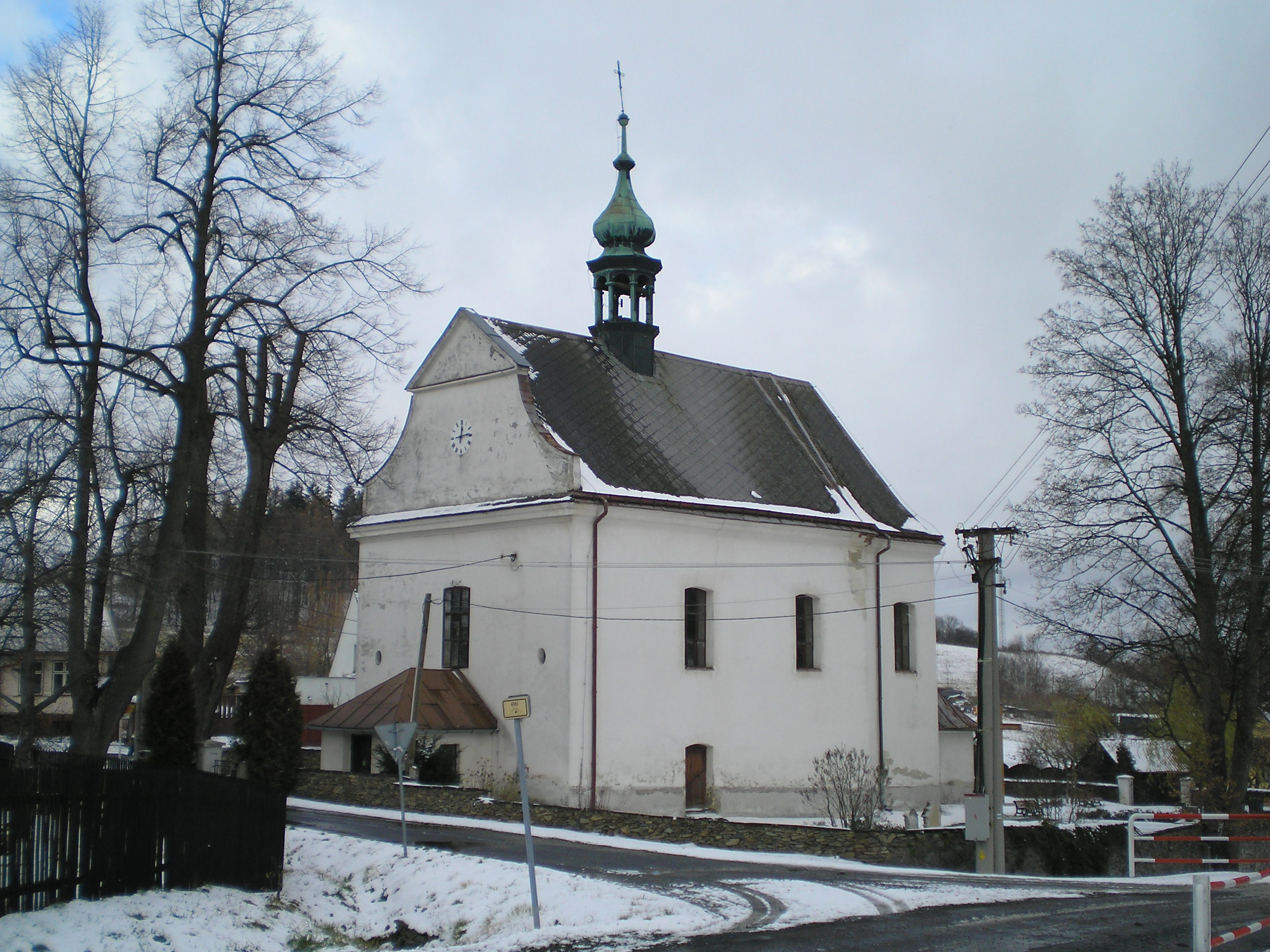
- Church of the Holy Trinity

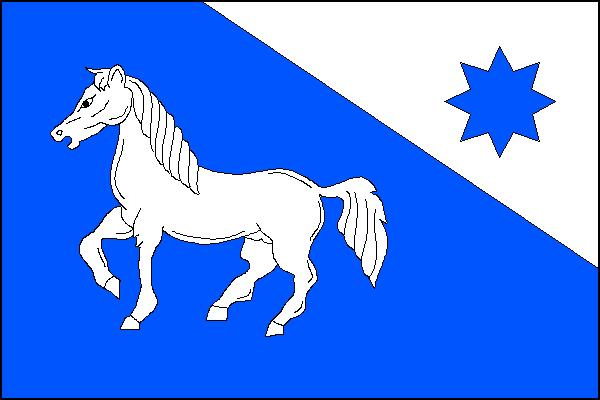
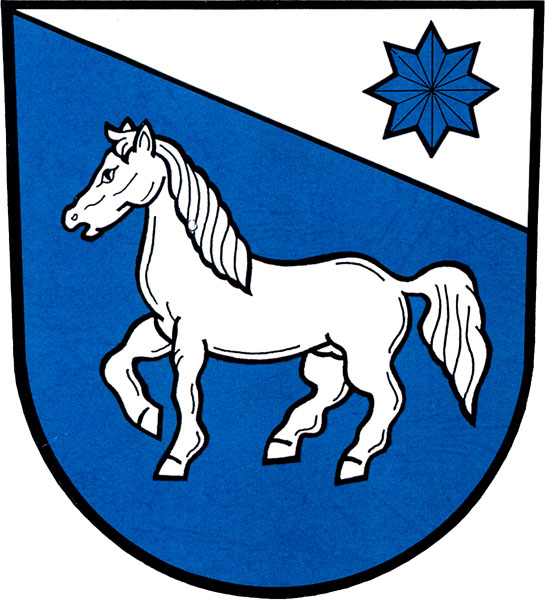
- Flag Coat of arms

- Location in the Czech Republic
- Coordinates: 49°57′31″N 17°28′38″E
- Country: Czech Republic
- Region: Moravian-Silesian
- District: Bruntál
- Founded: 1258

Area
  - Total: 11.41 km^{2} (4.41 sq mi)
- Elevation: 575 m (1,886 ft)

Population (2026-01-01)
  - Total: 366
  - Density: 32.1/km^{2} (83.1/sq mi)
- Time zone: UTC+1 (CET)
  - Summer (DST): UTC+2 (CEST)
- Postal code: 792 01
- Website: www.mezina.cz

Mezina (German: Messendorf) is a municipality and village in Bruntál District in the Moravian-Silesian Region of the Czech Republic. It has about 400 inhabitants.

== History ==
Mezina was founded in 1258.

== Demographics ==
Historical population
Year	Pop.	±%
1869	613	—
1880	578	−5.7%
1890	672	+16.3%
1900	668	−0.6%
1910	621	−7.0%
1921	559	−10.0%
1930	551	−1.4%
1950	287	−47.9%
1961	278	−3.1%
1970	316	+13.7%
1980	286	−9.5%
1991	215	−24.8%
2001	237	+10.2%
2011	311	+31.2%
2021	394	+26.7%
Source: Censuses
