= Bílčice =

- Municipality
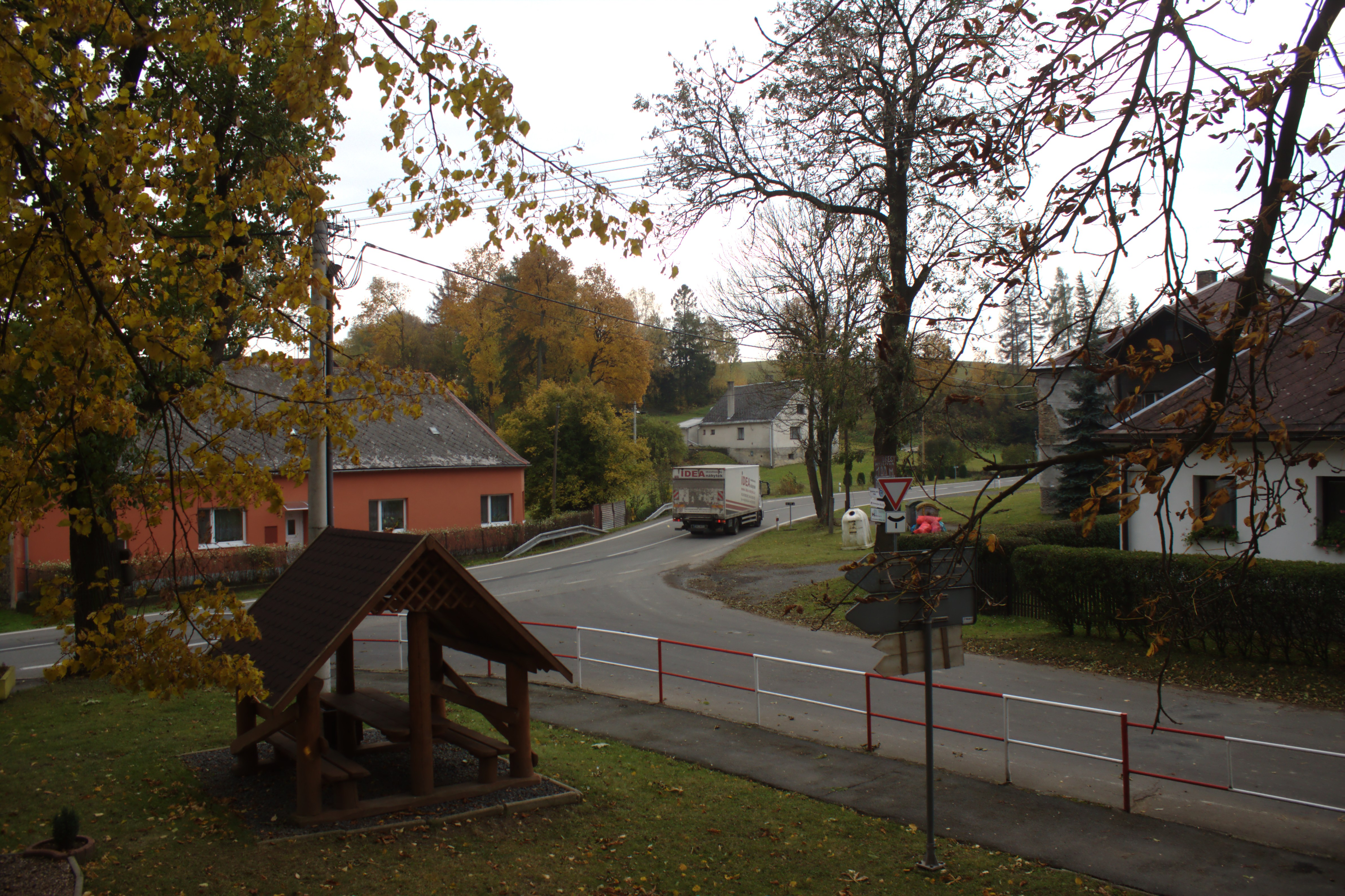
- Centre of Bílčice

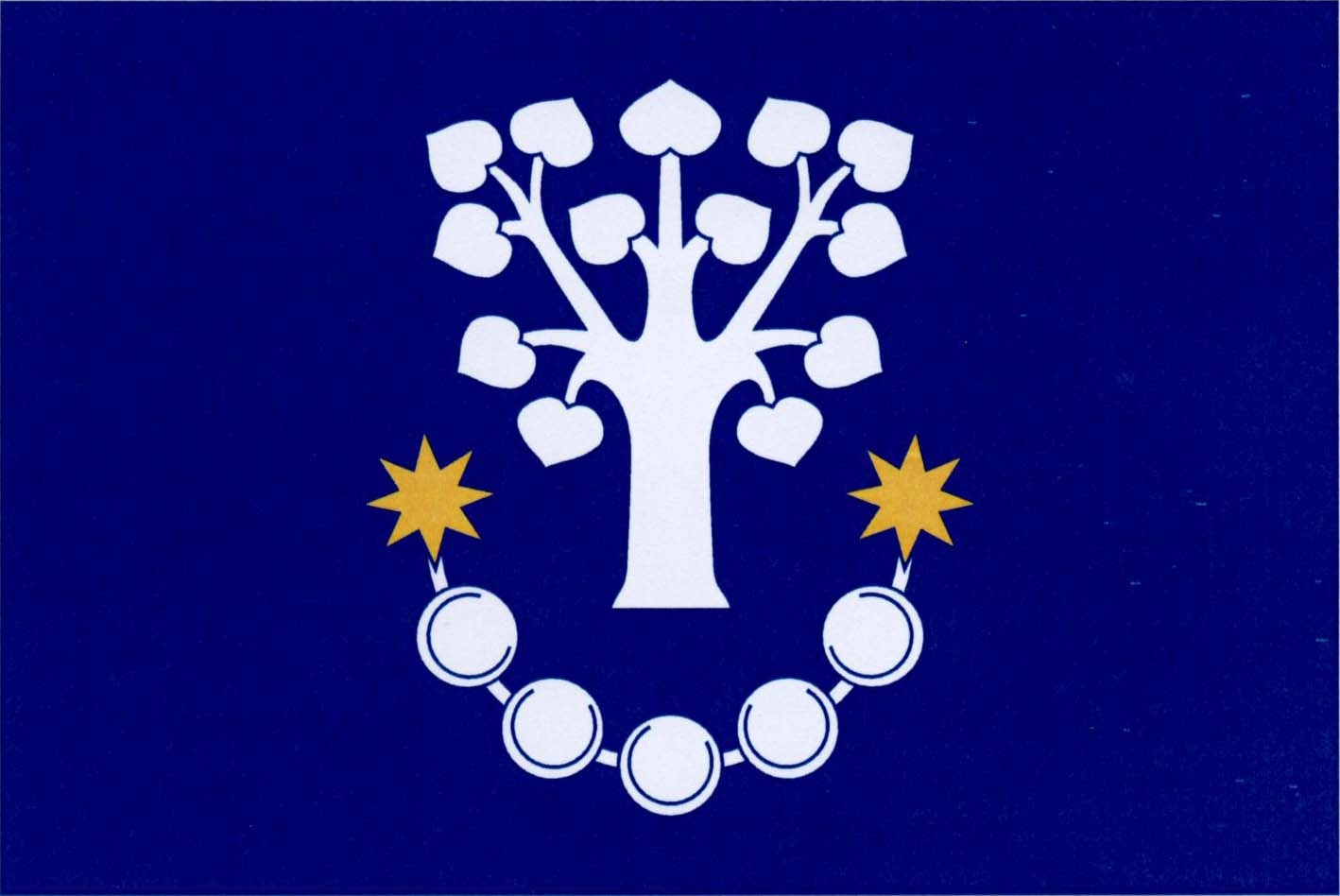
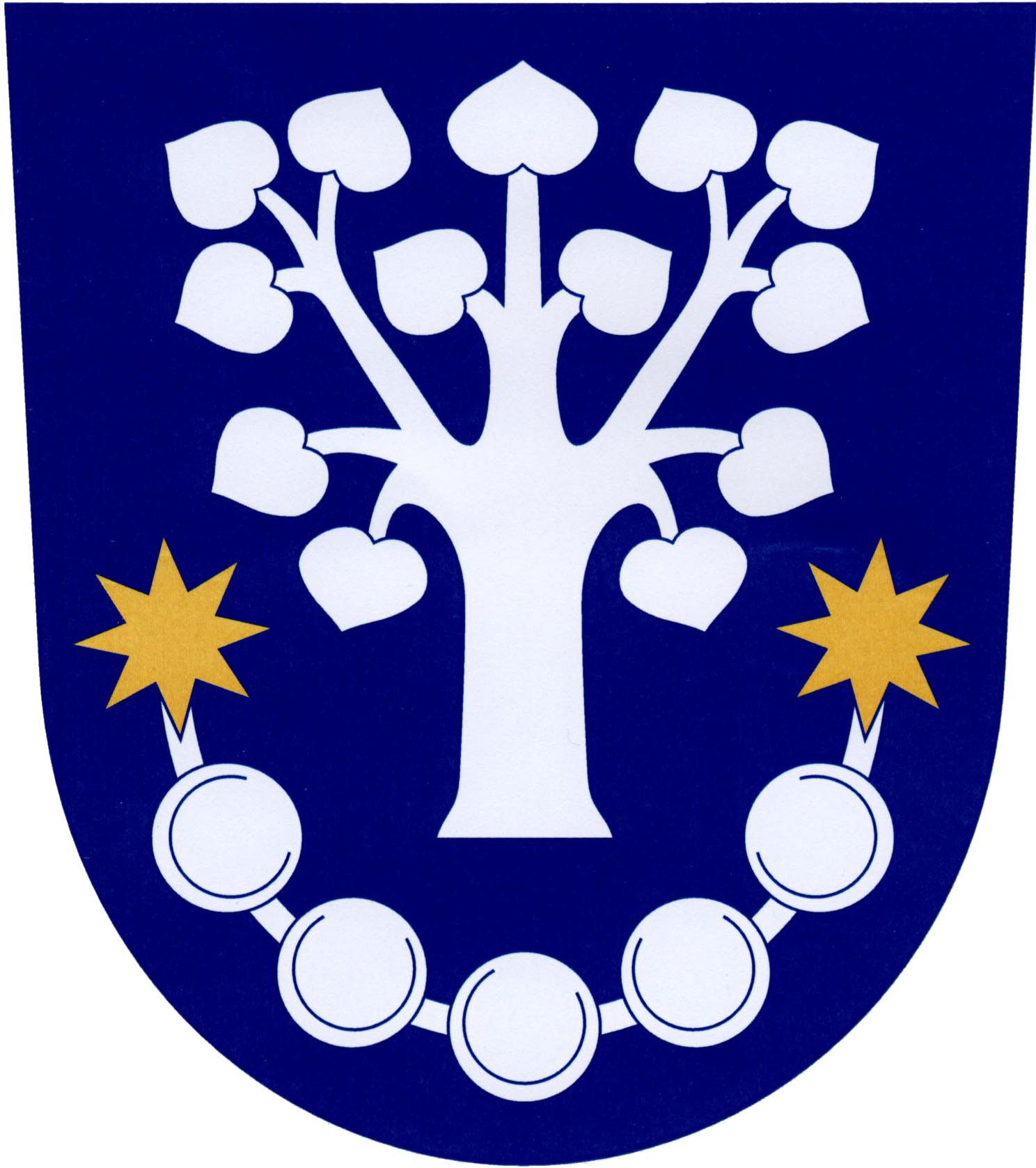
- Flag Coat of arms

- Location in the Czech Republic
- Coordinates: 49°52′11″N 17°33′56″E
- Country: Czech Republic
- Region: Moravian-Silesian
- District: Bruntál
- First mentioned: 1379

Area
  - Total: 24.32 km^{2} (9.39 sq mi)
- Elevation: 545 m (1,788 ft)

Population (2026-01-01)
  - Total: 221
  - Density: 9.09/km^{2} (23.5/sq mi)
- Time zone: UTC+1 (CET)
  - Summer (DST): UTC+2 (CEST)
- Postal code: 793 68
- Website: www.bilcice.cz

Bílčice (German: Heidenpiltsch) is a municipality and village in Bruntál District in the Moravian-Silesian Region of the Czech Republic. It has about 200 inhabitants.

== Administrative division ==
Bílčice consists of two municipal parts (in brackets population according to the 2021 census):

- Bílčice (186)
- Májůvka (22)

== Demographics ==
Historical population
Year	Pop.	±%
1869	988	—
1880	995	+0.7%
1890	951	−4.4%
1900	1,023	+7.6%
1910	1,234	+20.6%
1921	1,133	−8.2%
1930	1,228	+8.4%
1950	421	−65.7%
1961	384	−8.8%
1970	330	−14.1%
1980	293	−11.2%
1991	300	+2.4%
2001	250	−16.7%
2011	247	−1.2%
2021	208	−15.8%
Source: Censuses

== Gallery ==
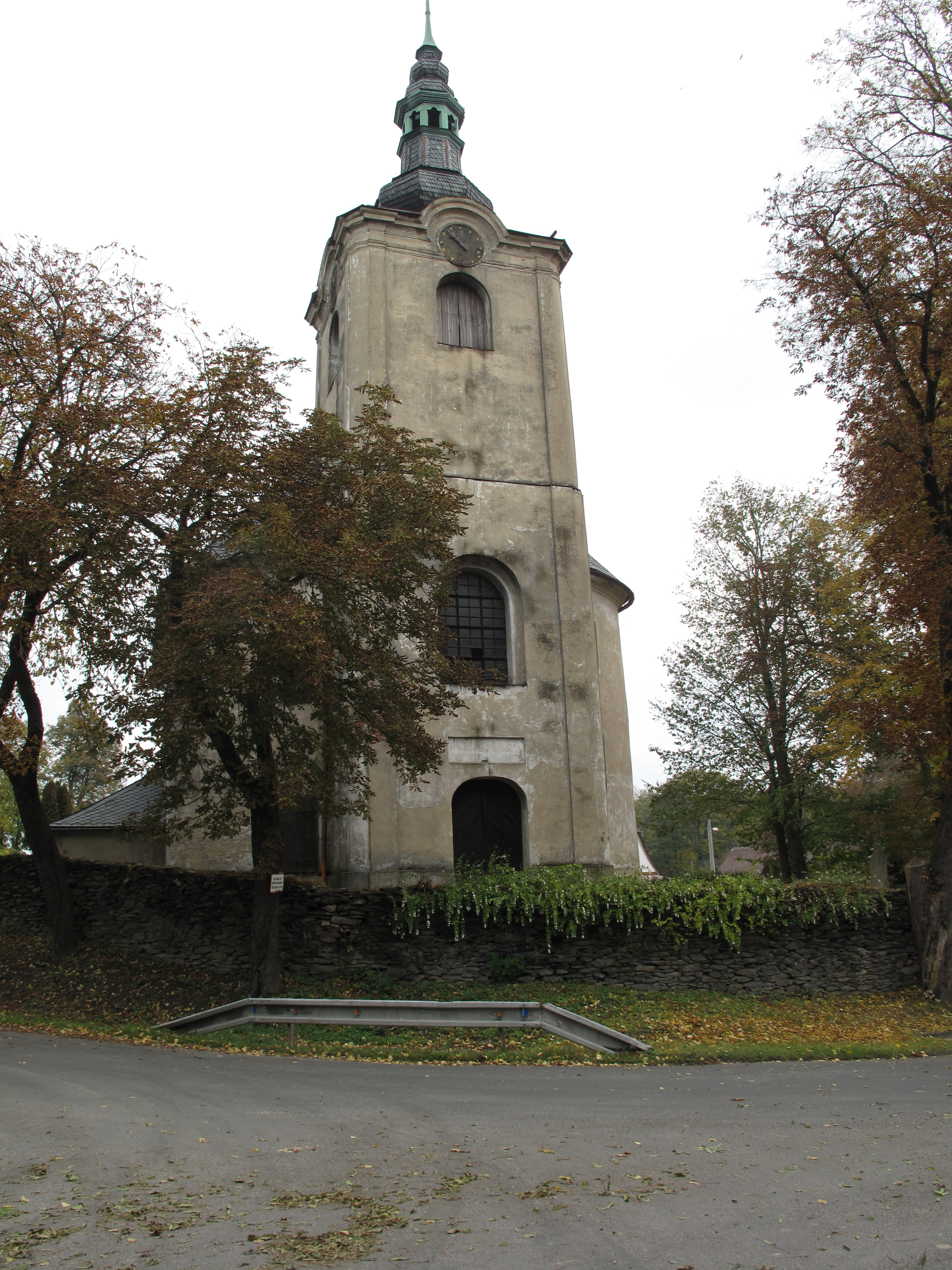
Church of Saint Margaret

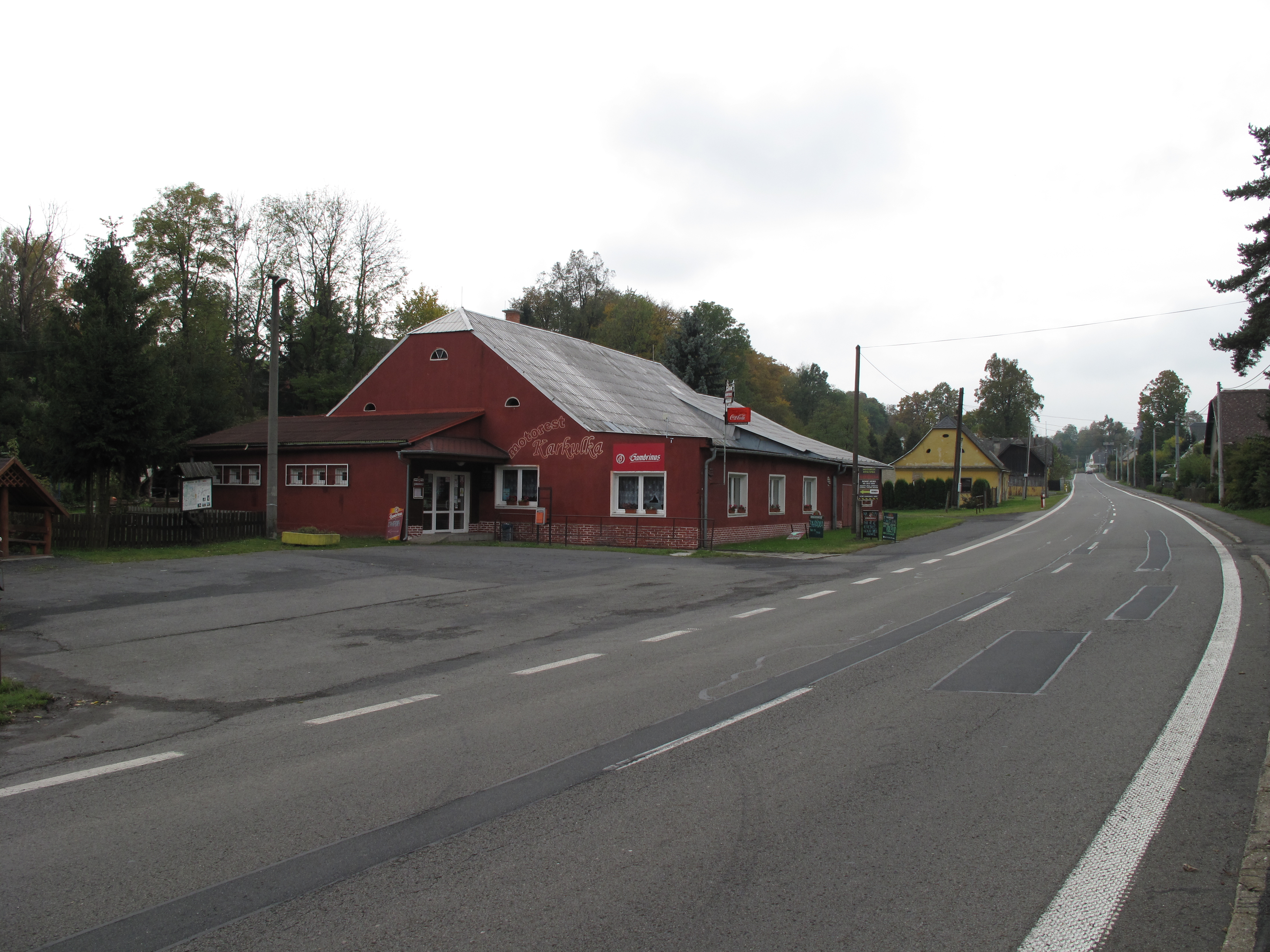
Main road

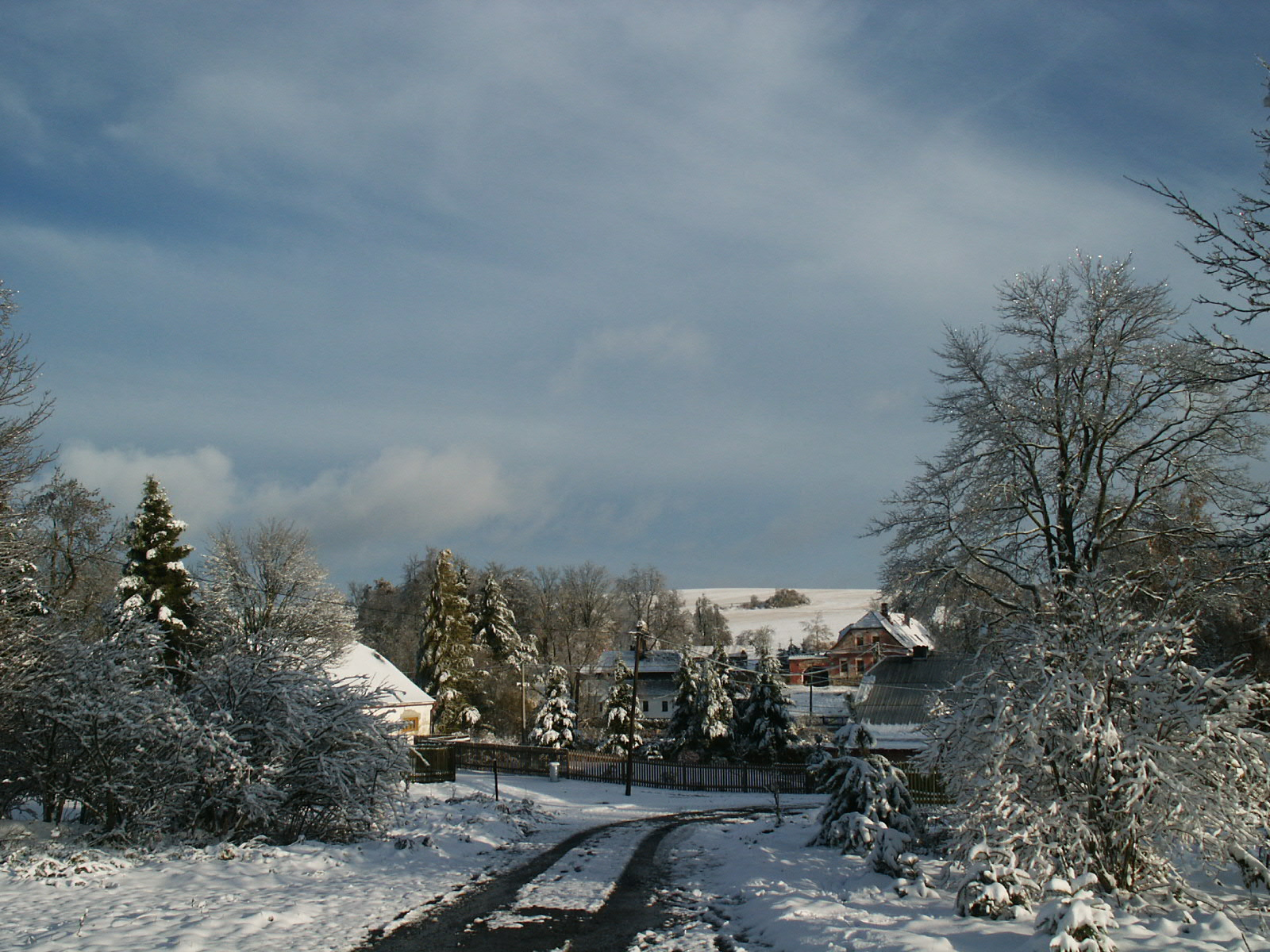
Májůvka, a part of Bílčice
