= Stará Ves (Bruntál District) =

- Municipality
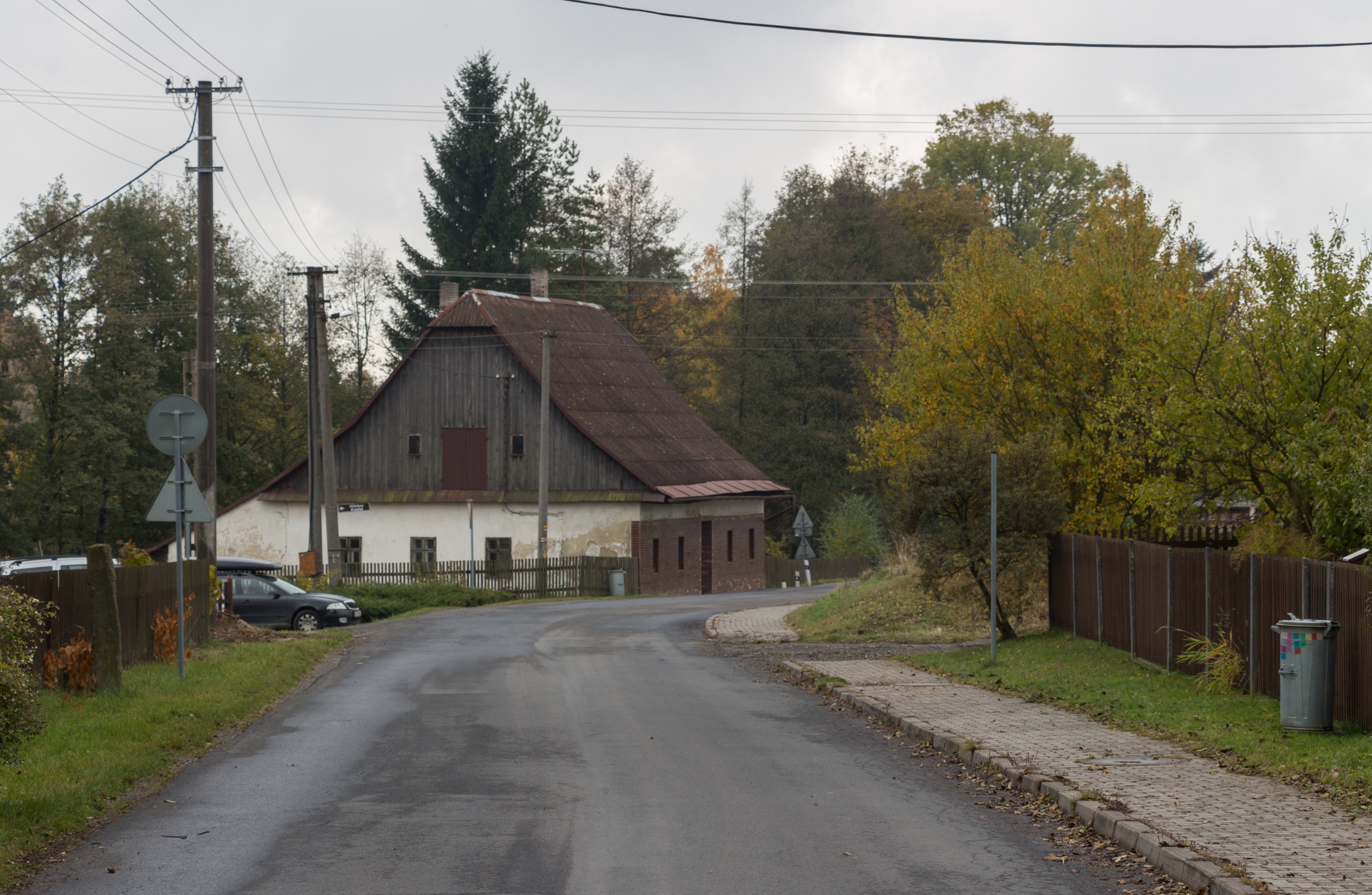
- Potočná Street

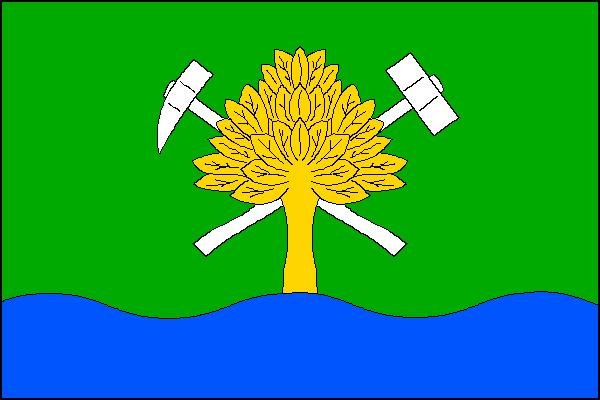
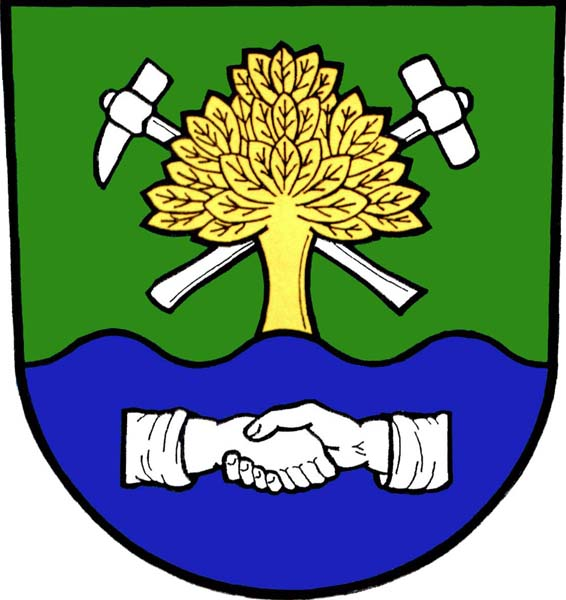
- Flag Coat of arms

- Location in the Czech Republic
- Coordinates: 49°57′30″N 17°14′11″E
- Country: Czech Republic
- Region: Moravian-Silesian
- District: Bruntál
- First mentioned: 1561

Area
  - Total: 44.07 km^{2} (17.02 sq mi)
- Elevation: 645 m (2,116 ft)

Population (2026-01-01)
  - Total: 448
  - Density: 10.2/km^{2} (26.3/sq mi)
- Time zone: UTC+1 (CET)
  - Summer (DST): UTC+2 (CEST)
- Postal code: 795 01
- Website: www.staraves.eu

Stará Ves (German: Altendorf) is a municipality and village in Bruntál District in the Moravian-Silesian Region of the Czech Republic. It has about 400 inhabitants.

== Administrative division ==
Stará Ves consists of two municipal parts (in brackets population according to the 2021 census):

- Stará Ves (427)
- Žďárský Potok (36)

== History ==
The first written mention of Stará Ves is from 1561.

== Demographics ==
Historical population
Year	Pop.	±%
1869	3,100	—
1880	2,969	−4.2%
1890	2,632	−11.4%
1900	2,527	−4.0%
1910	2,354	−6.8%
1921	1,922	−18.4%
1930	2,028	+5.5%
1950	1,110	−45.3%
1961	984	−11.4%
1970	779	−20.8%
1980	591	−24.1%
1991	496	−16.1%
2001	516	+4.0%
2011	503	−2.5%
2021	463	−8.0%
Source: Censuses
