= Milotice nad Opavou =

- Municipality
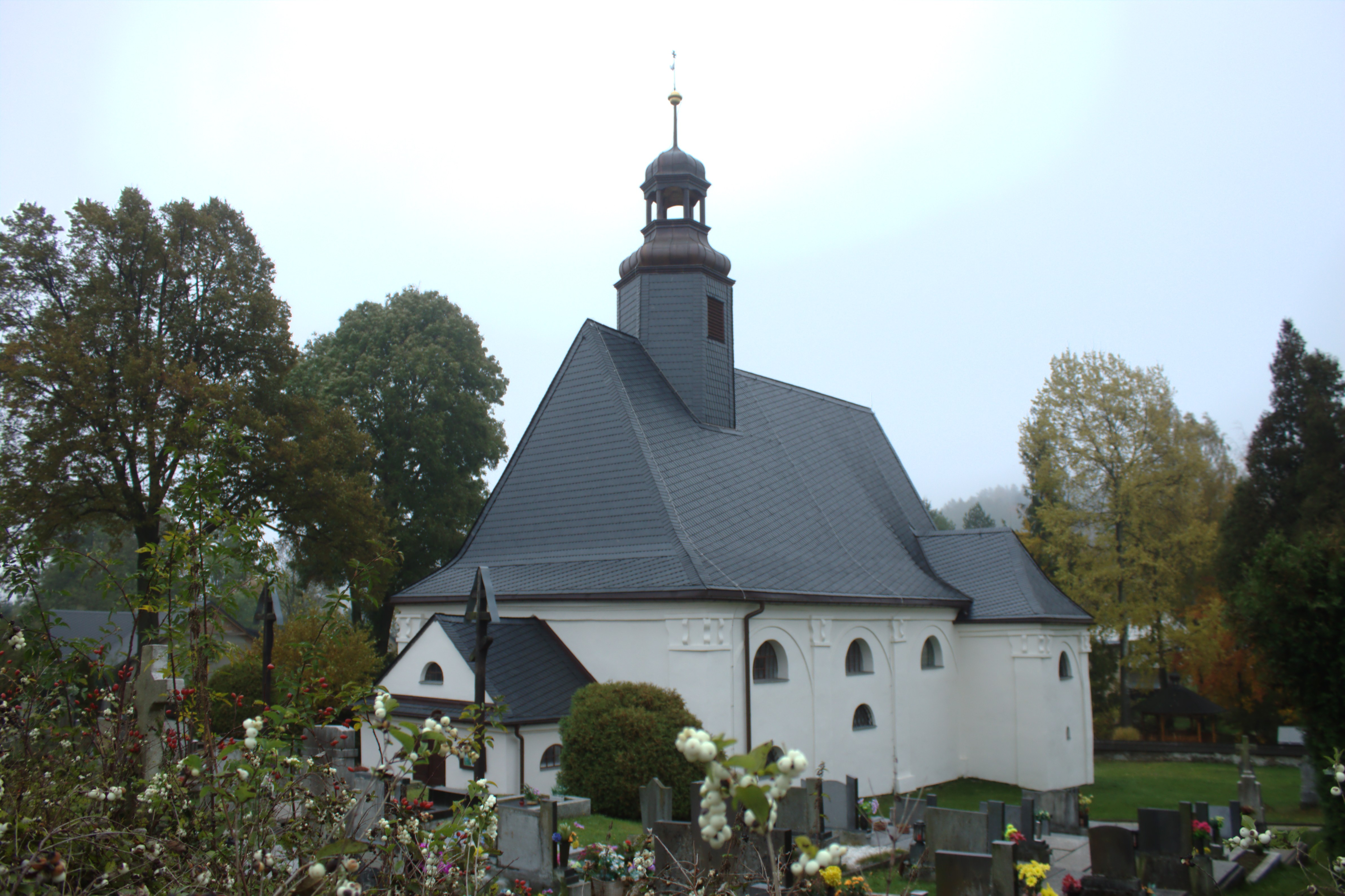
- Church of the Assumption of the Virgin Mary

- Flag Coat of arms

- Location in the Czech Republic
- Coordinates: 49°59′45″N 17°32′32″E
- Country: Czech Republic
- Region: Moravian-Silesian
- District: Bruntál
- First mentioned: 1288

Area
  - Total: 19.23 km^{2} (7.42 sq mi)
- Elevation: 509 m (1,670 ft)

Population (2026-01-01)
  - Total: 427
  - Density: 22.2/km^{2} (57.5/sq mi)
- Time zone: UTC+1 (CET)
  - Summer (DST): UTC+2 (CEST)
- Postal code: 792 01
- Website: www.miloticenadopavou.cz

Milotice nad Opavou (German: Milkendorf) is a municipality and village in Bruntál District in the Moravian-Silesian Region of the Czech Republic. It has about 400 inhabitants.

== History ==
The first written mention of Milotice nad Opavou is from 1288.

== Demographics ==
Historical population
Year	Pop.	±%
1869	1,165	—
1880	1,144	−1.8%
1890	1,150	+0.5%
1900	1,084	−5.7%
1910	1,107	+2.1%
1921	1,091	−1.4%
1930	1,174	+7.6%
1950	664	−43.4%
1961	609	−8.3%
1970	472	−22.5%
1980	492	+4.2%
1991	398	−19.1%
2001	398	+0.0%
2011	406	+2.0%
2021	375	−7.6%
Source: Censuses
