= Lichnov (Bruntál District) =

- Municipality
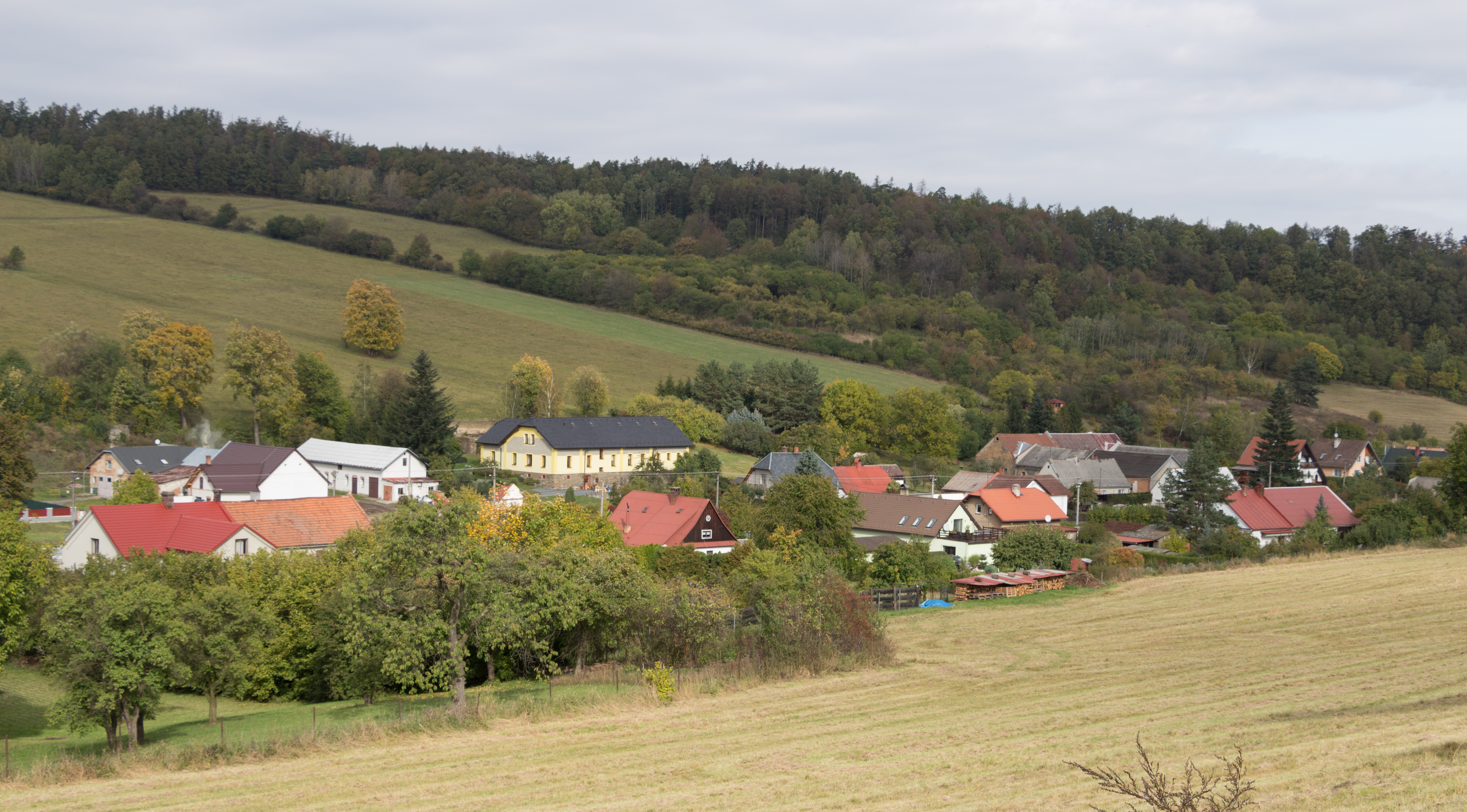
- General view of Lichnov

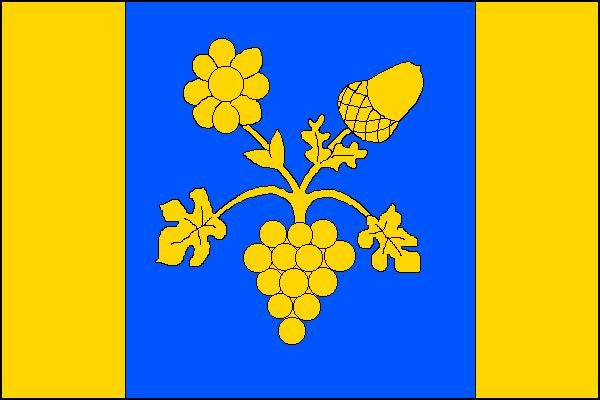
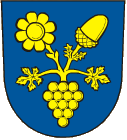
- Flag Coat of arms

- Location in the Czech Republic
- Coordinates: 50°0′28″N 17°37′35″E
- Country: Czech Republic
- Region: Moravian-Silesian
- District: Bruntál
- First mentioned: 1340

Area
  - Total: 27.29 km^{2} (10.54 sq mi)
- Elevation: 380 m (1,250 ft)

Population (2026-01-01)
  - Total: 1,017
  - Density: 37.27/km^{2} (96.52/sq mi)
- Time zone: UTC+1 (CET)
  - Summer (DST): UTC+2 (CEST)
- Postal codes: 793 15, 794 01
- Website: www.obeclichnov.cz

Lichnov (German: Lichten) is a municipality and village in Bruntál District in the Moravian-Silesian Region of the Czech Republic. It has about 1,000 inhabitants.

== Administrative division ==
Lichnov consists of two municipal parts (in brackets population according to the 2021 census):

- Lichnov (895)
- Dubnice (112)

== Demographics ==
Historical population
Year	Pop.	±%
1869	2,283	—
1880	2,314	+1.4%
1890	2,367	+2.3%
1900	2,253	−4.8%
1910	2,267	+0.6%
1921	2,047	−9.7%
1930	2,320	+13.3%
1950	1,149	−50.5%
1961	1,186	+3.2%
1970	1,158	−2.4%
1980	1,082	−6.6%
1991	1,049	−3.0%
2001	1,090	+3.9%
2011	1,040	−4.6%
2021	1,007	−3.2%
Source: Censuses
