= Branka u Opavy =

- Municipality
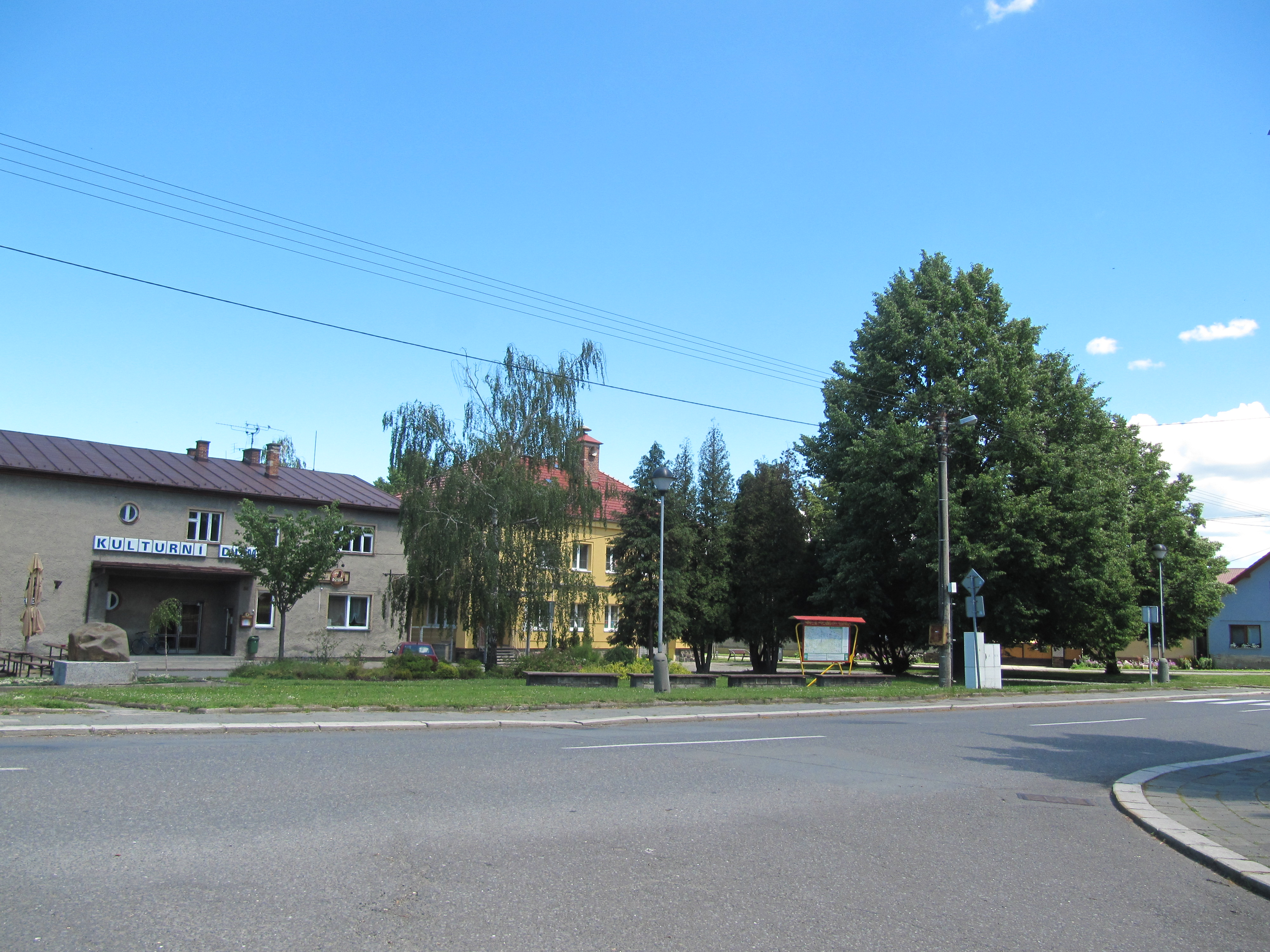
- Centre of Branka u Opavy

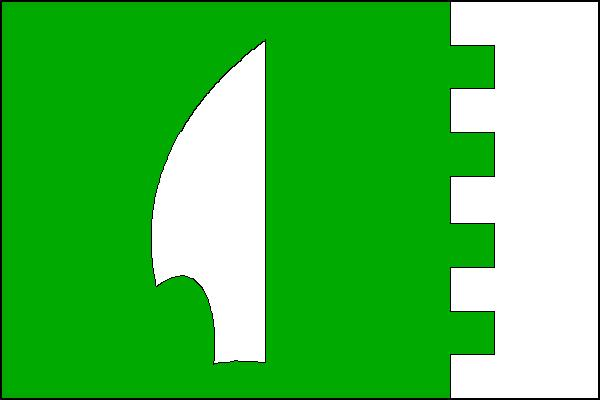
- Flag Coat of arms

- Location in the Czech Republic
- Coordinates: 49°53′17″N 17°52′58″E
- Country: Czech Republic
- Region: Moravian-Silesian
- District: Opava
- First mentioned: 1257

Area
  - Total: 6.92 km^{2} (2.67 sq mi)
- Elevation: 264 m (866 ft)

Population (2026-01-01)
  - Total: 1,063
  - Density: 154/km^{2} (398/sq mi)
- Time zone: UTC+1 (CET)
  - Summer (DST): UTC+2 (CEST)
- Postal code: 747 41
- Website: www.branka.eu

Branka u Opavy is a municipality and village in Opava District in the Moravian-Silesian Region of the Czech Republic. It has about 1,100 inhabitants.

== Geography ==
Branka u Opavy is located about 5 kilometres (3 mi) south of Opava and 24 km (15 mi) west of Ostrava. The northern part of the municipality lies in the Opava Hilly Land and the southern part lies in the Nízký Jeseník range. The highest point is at 411 m (1,348 ft) above sea level. The Moravice River flows through the municipality.

== History ==
The first written mention of Branka u Opavy is from 1257, when it was part of the Hradec estate.

== Demographics ==
Historical population

Year	Pop.	±%
1869	347	—
1880	428	+23.3%
1890	440	+2.8%
1900	464	+5.5%
1910	650	+40.1%

Year	Pop.	±%
1921	721	+10.9%
1930	758	+5.1%
1950	691	−8.8%
1961	638	−7.7%
1970	641	+0.5%

Year	Pop.	±%
1980	781	+21.8%
1991	796	+1.9%
2001	1,013	+27.3%
2011	1,072	+5.8%
2021	1,017	−5.1%

Source: Censuses

== Transport ==
The I/57 road from Opava to Nový Jičín runs through the municipality.

Branka u Opavy is located on a short railway line of local importance from Opava to Hradec nad Moravicí.

== Sights ==
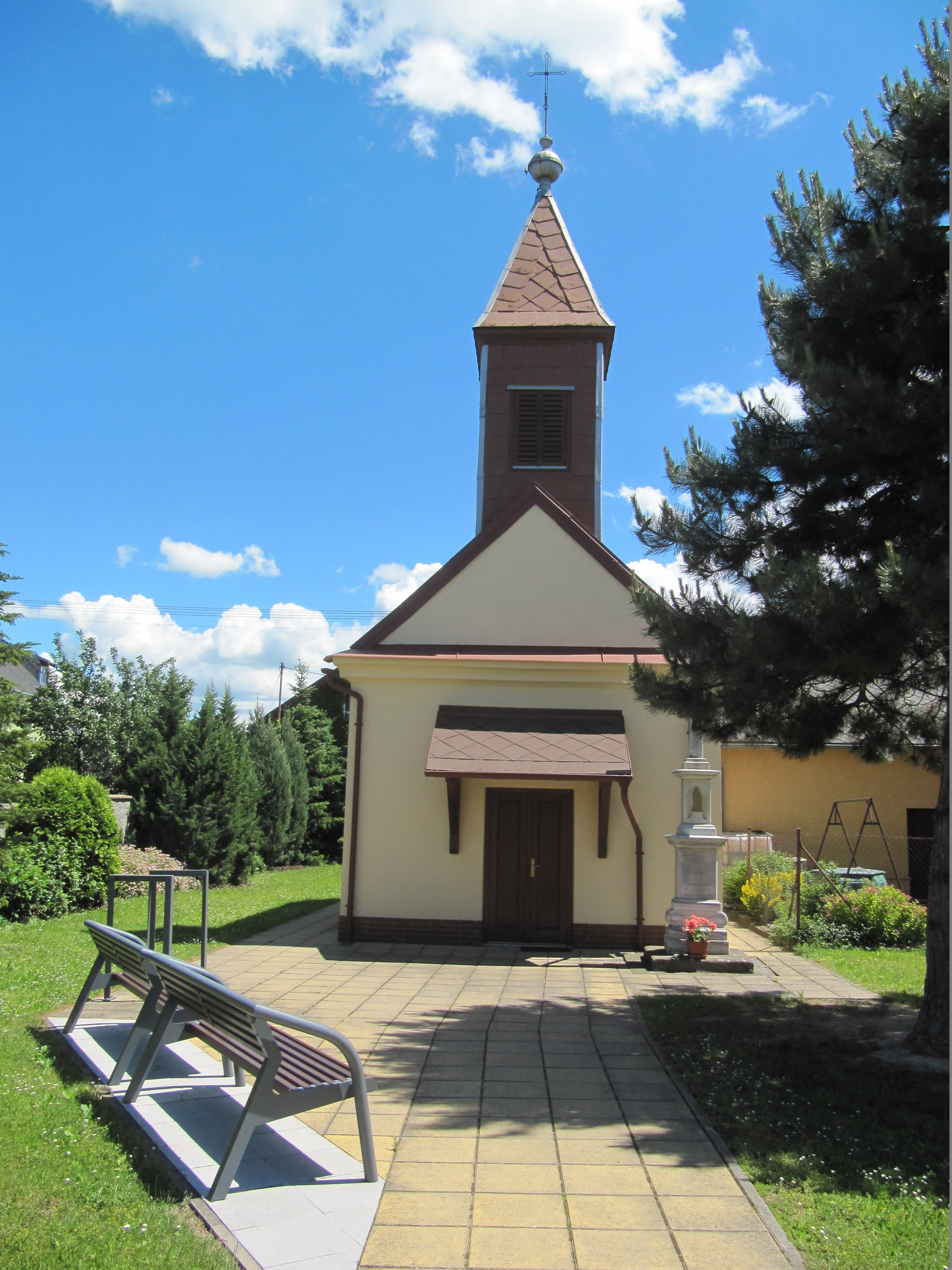
Chapel of the Holy Trinity

There are no protected cultural monuments in the municipality. A landmark is the Chapel of the Holy Trinity in the centre of the village.

== Twin towns – sister cities ==
Branka u Opavy is twinned with:

- Kornowac, Poland
