= Vysoká hole =

Mountain in the Czech Republic

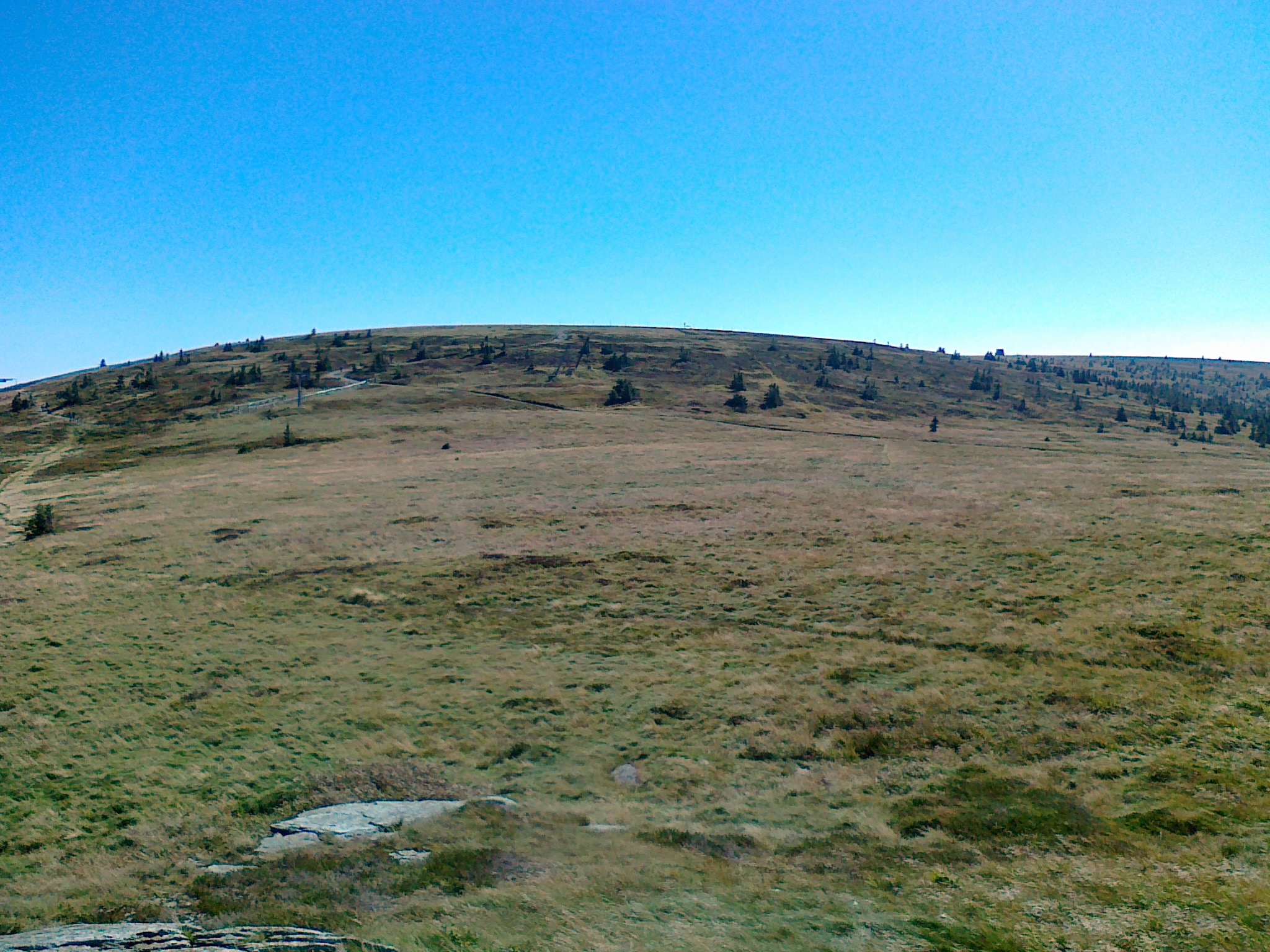
- View from the north

Highest point
- Elevation: 1,465 m (4,806 ft)
- Prominence: 150 m
- Isolation: 2 km (1.2 mi)
- Coordinates: 50°3′46″N 17°14′7″E

Geography
- Location within Czech Republic
- Location: Malá Morávka
- Parent range: Hrubý Jeseník

Vysoká hole (German: Hohe Heide) is a mountain in the Hrubý Jeseník mountain range in the Czech Republic. It has an elevation of 1,465 m (4,806 ft) above sea level. It is located in the municipality of Malá Morávka, on the historical border between Silesia and Moravia.

== History ==
The main path passing through the mountain has been known since around 1500. It was used in the past by hunters, shepherds, and later by the military. Already during the Austro-Prussian War in 1866, in July, a group of Austrian partisans led by Alfred von Vivenot hid on the mountain to evade the Prussians. From 1919 to 1922, a Czechoslovak military training area was located on the mountain. During World War II, the German Luftwaffe built a radar station on the mountain, as well as an aerodrome in the spring of 1944, which was left unfinished (traces visible from a bird's-eye view) for small reconnaissance aircraft. Until the 19th century, Vysoká hole was considered the highest peak in the Hrubý Jeseník chain. Only later, more precise height measurements showed the superiority of Praděd.

=== Airplane crash ===
On 27 February 1950, at 7:31 GMT, a plane crash occurred involving a Czechoslovak Airlines' Douglas DC-3 passenger aircraft under the command of Captain Václav Soukup flying from Ostrava to Prague. On board were 4 crew members and 27 passengers. In difficult weather conditions (fog, drizzle, strong wind, and low temperature), the plane crashed into the mountain. Thanks to the rescue operation carried out by the Mountain Rescue Service of the Czech Republic in the Hrubý Jeseník mountains, founded in 1948 under the leadership of its founder Václav Myšák with the assistance of military paratroopers, during which the injured were transported to the Ovčárna mountain hut and hospitals in Bruntál and Rýmařov, 25 passengers and 1 crew member were rescued. The cause of the crash was determined to be pilot error: failure to comply with the recommended minimum flight altitude and deviation from the planned flight route due to navigation errors in difficult weather conditions.

== Description ==
=== Location ===
Vysoká hole is the second highest mountain (after Praděd) in Czech Silesia, Moravia, and in the Hrubý Jeseník mountain range. It is a very extensive mountain with a flat and leveled mountaintop plateau (approximately 20 ha (49 acres)), located about 2.5 km (1.6 mi) south of Praděd, lying on its main ridge extending from the Červenohorské sedlo pass to the Skřítek pass. It is a massive mountain with an almost level-shaped summit area.

The mountain is bordered by the U Barborky pass and the valley of the Bílá Opava stream to the north, by a pass at an altitude of 1,018 m (3,340 ft) above sea level towards the Hradečná summit to the east, by the valley of the stream Bělokamenný potok and passes at altitudes of 1,206 m (3,957 ft) above sea level towards the Temná summit and 1,208 m (3,963 ft) above sea level towards the Ráztoka summit to the southeast, and by the Kamzičník summit and the valley of the Divoká Desná stream to the southwest. Numerous summits surround it: Petrovy kameny to the north, Ostrý vrch and Hradečná to the northeast, U pecí to the east, Temná and Ráztoká to the southeast, Kamzičník to the south, and Nad soutokem, Zámčisko to the southwest.

=== Slopes ===
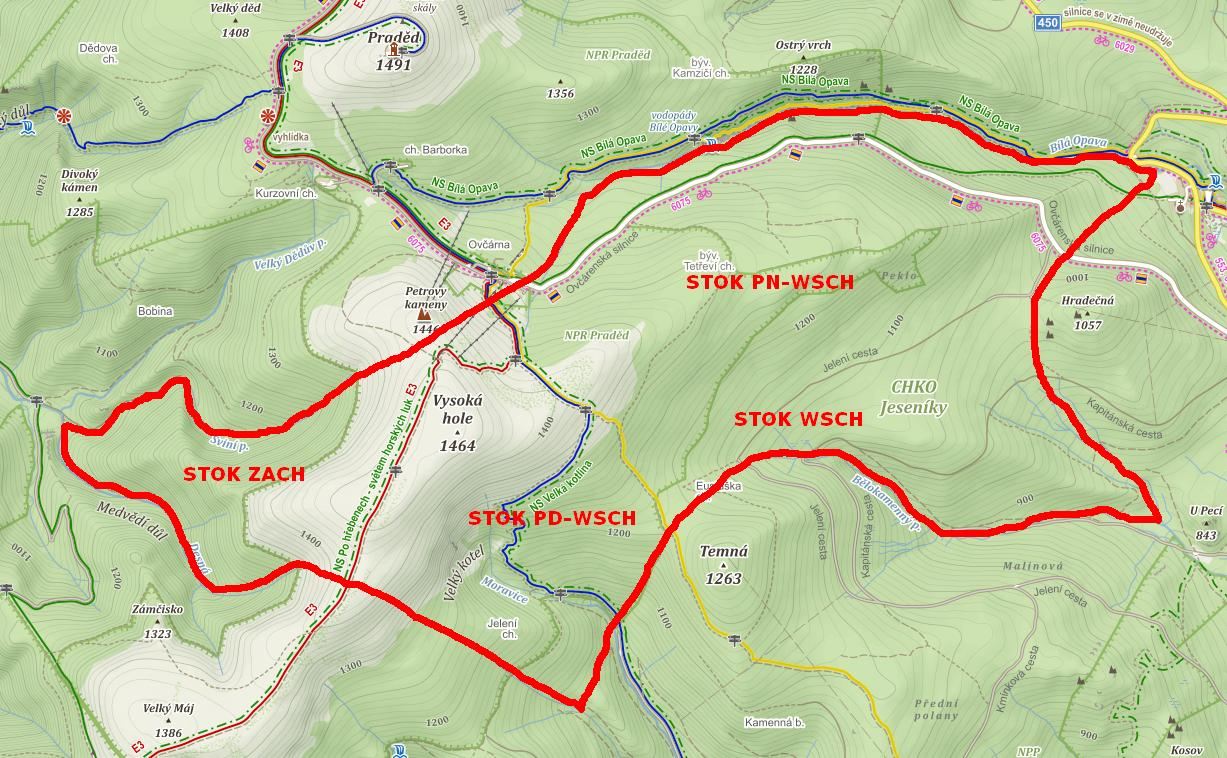
Map of the extent and slopes of Vysoká hole mountain

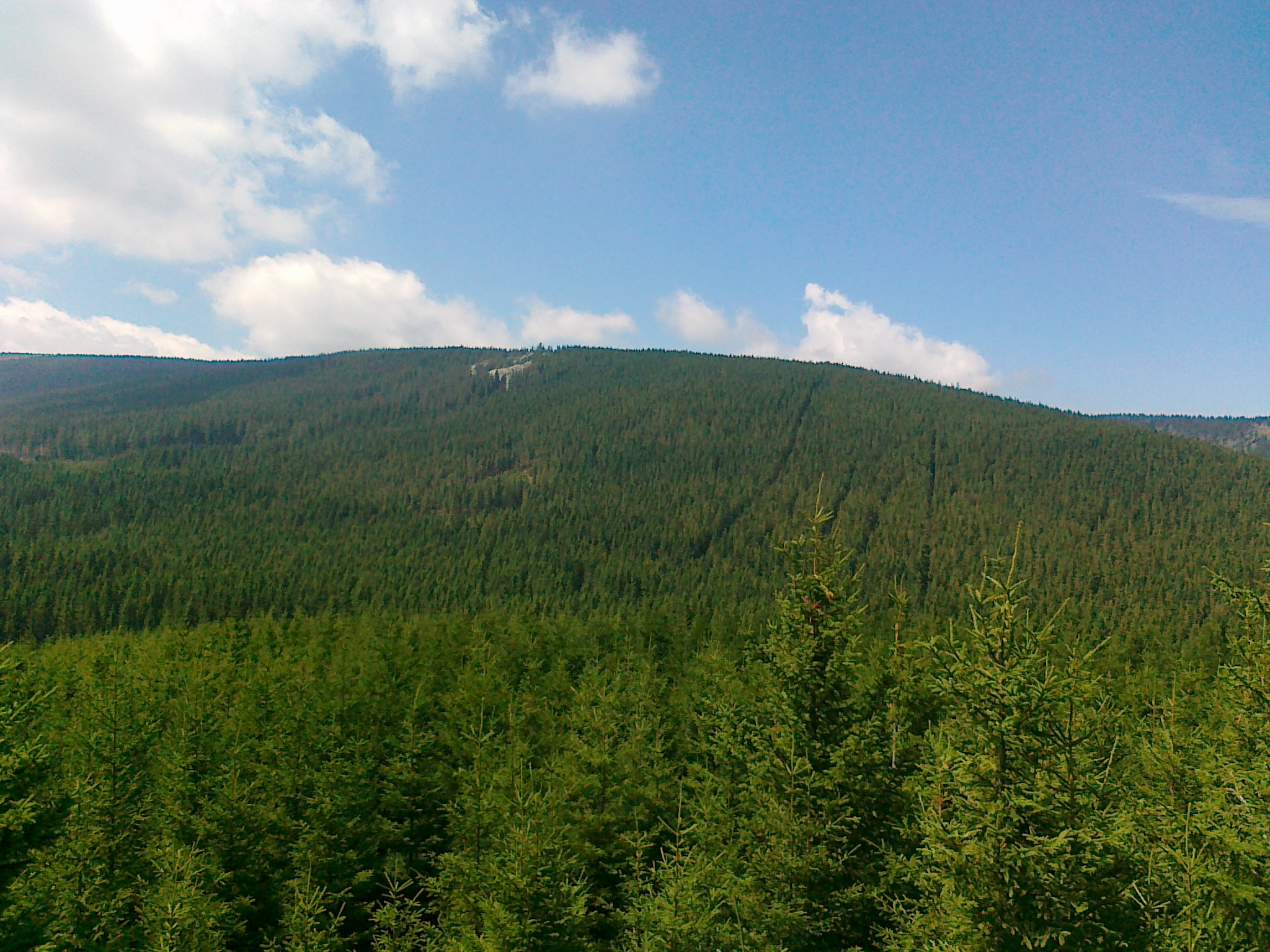
View from a rocky outcrop near the summit of Hradečná on Suť (Stone Sea) on the slope of Vysoká hole mountain

Generally, four main slopes of the mountain can be distinguished:

- western slope, extending from the summit plateau to the Nad soutokem mountain, bounded by two couloirs named Sviní žleb (Note: Some sources give the name of the couloir as Svinní žleb) (from the north) and Medvědí důl (from the south), very steep with an average gradient reaching up to 45° over a 50-meter section;
- northeastern slope, extending towards a pass located at an altitude of 1,018 m (3,340 ft) above sea level towards the Hradečná mountain, bounded by the valley of the Bílá Opava stream from the north;
- eastern slope named Dlouhý vrch, the longest (approximately 4.8 km (3.0 mi)), extending towards the U pecí mountain, bounded by the valley of the Bělokamenný potok stream from the south;
- southeastern slope, extending towards a pass located at an altitude of 1,206 m (3,957 ft) above sea level towards the Temná mountain.

On some maps, an additional summit named Suť (1,224 m (4,016 ft) above sea level) appears on the northeastern slope of the mountain. However, due to the low differentiation and exposure of this summit compared to the slope, newer studies and measurements suggest assigning this name to a part of the slope

The slopes of the mountain display overgrown grassy craters (up to 10 m (33 ft) in diameter and 1.5 m (4 ft 11 in) deep) from artillery exercises in 1919–1922 and possibly from bomb explosions during World War II. All slopes (except designated hiking trails) are covered by a network of roads (including Ovčárenská silnice, Jelení cesta) and paths. It is recommended to use detailed maps for navigation while traversing them.

The slopes have gentle, relatively uniform, and undifferentiated gradients. The average gradient of the slopes varies from 11° (western slope) to 8° (northeastern and eastern slopes). The overall average gradient of all slopes of the mountain (weighted average gradient) is approximately 9°. The maximum average gradient of the western slope near the Sviní žleb ravine over a 50-meter section does not exceed 45°.

Below an altitude of approximately 1,300–1,350 m (4,270–4,430 ft) above sea level, all slopes are predominantly forested with spruce trees. Above these altitudes, there are non-forested areas mostly covered by alpine meadows. In the cirque (Velký kotel basin), due to varied environmental conditions and a variable microclimate, alpine, subalpine, rocky, thermophilic, spring, and wetland vegetation coexist alongside various types of forest vegetation. Additionally, some slopes feature rocky outcrops (on the northeastern slope, near the Bílá Opava valley at altitudes around 1,095–1,140 m (3,593–3,740 ft) above sea level, and on the southeastern slope, near the Velký kotel basin at altitudes of 1,246–1,310 m (4,088–4,298 ft) above sea level).

=== Main summit ===
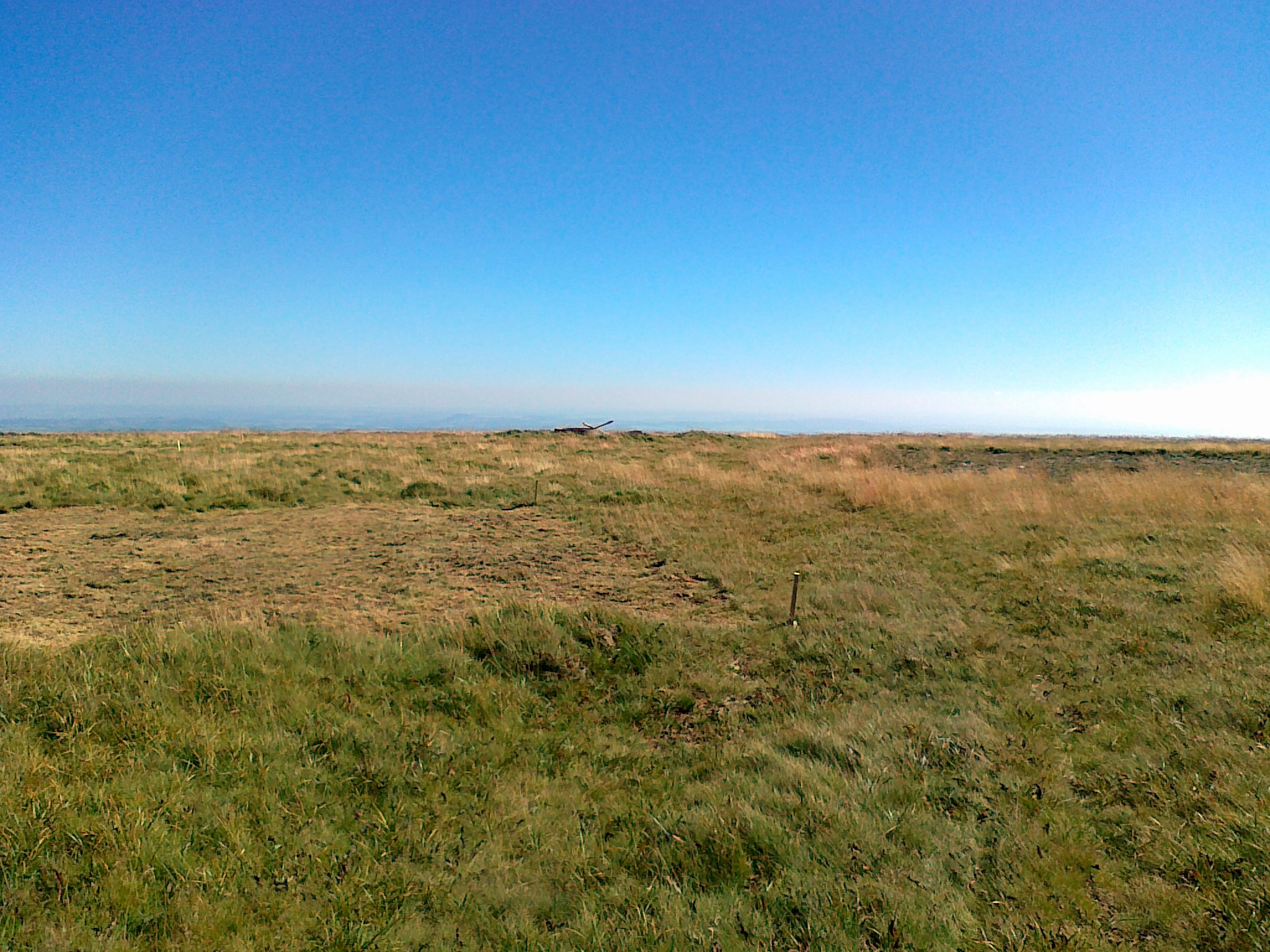
Summit plateau of Vysoká hole mountain

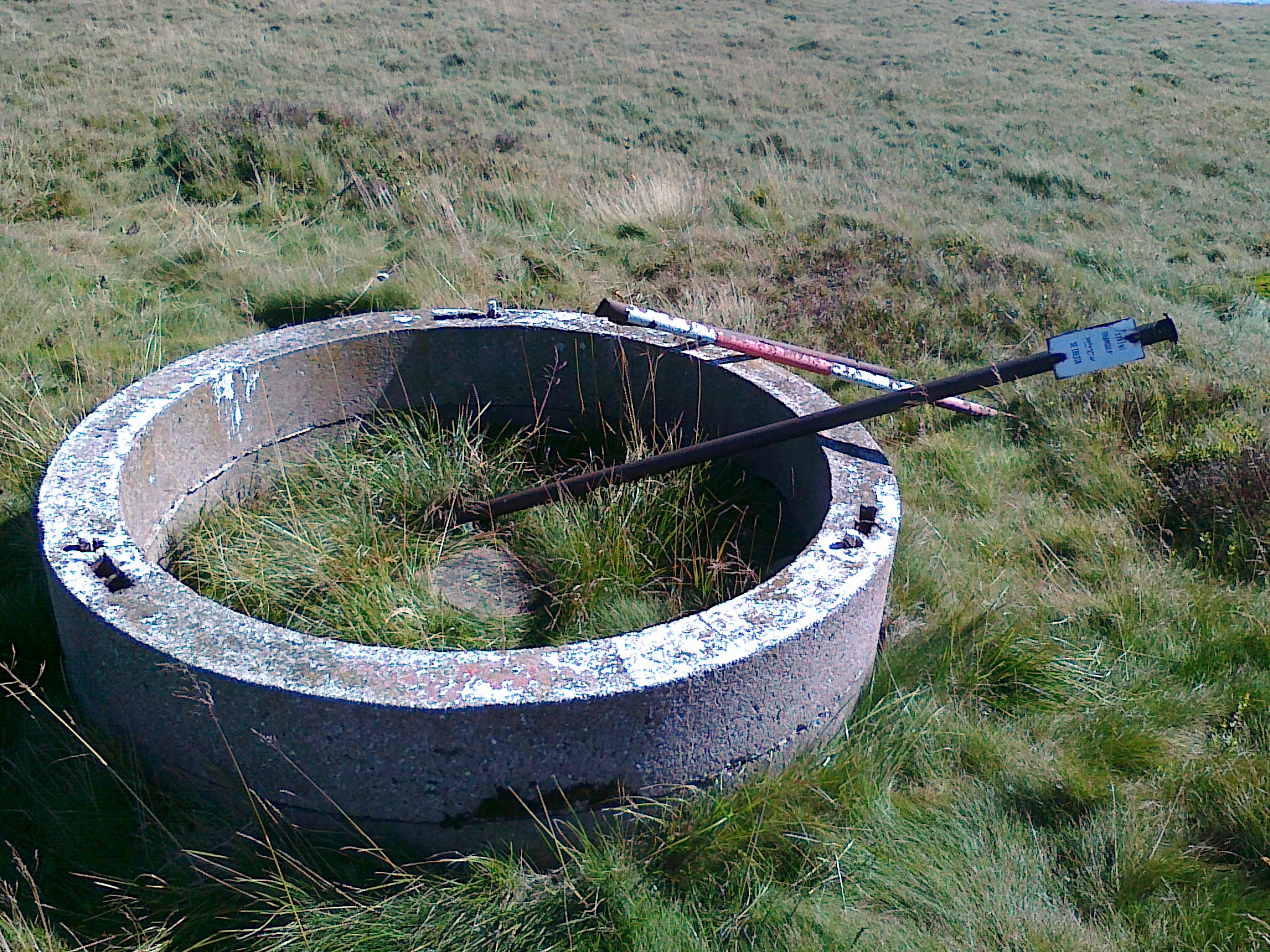
Triangulation station encased with concrete circles on the summit slope of Vysoká hole mountain

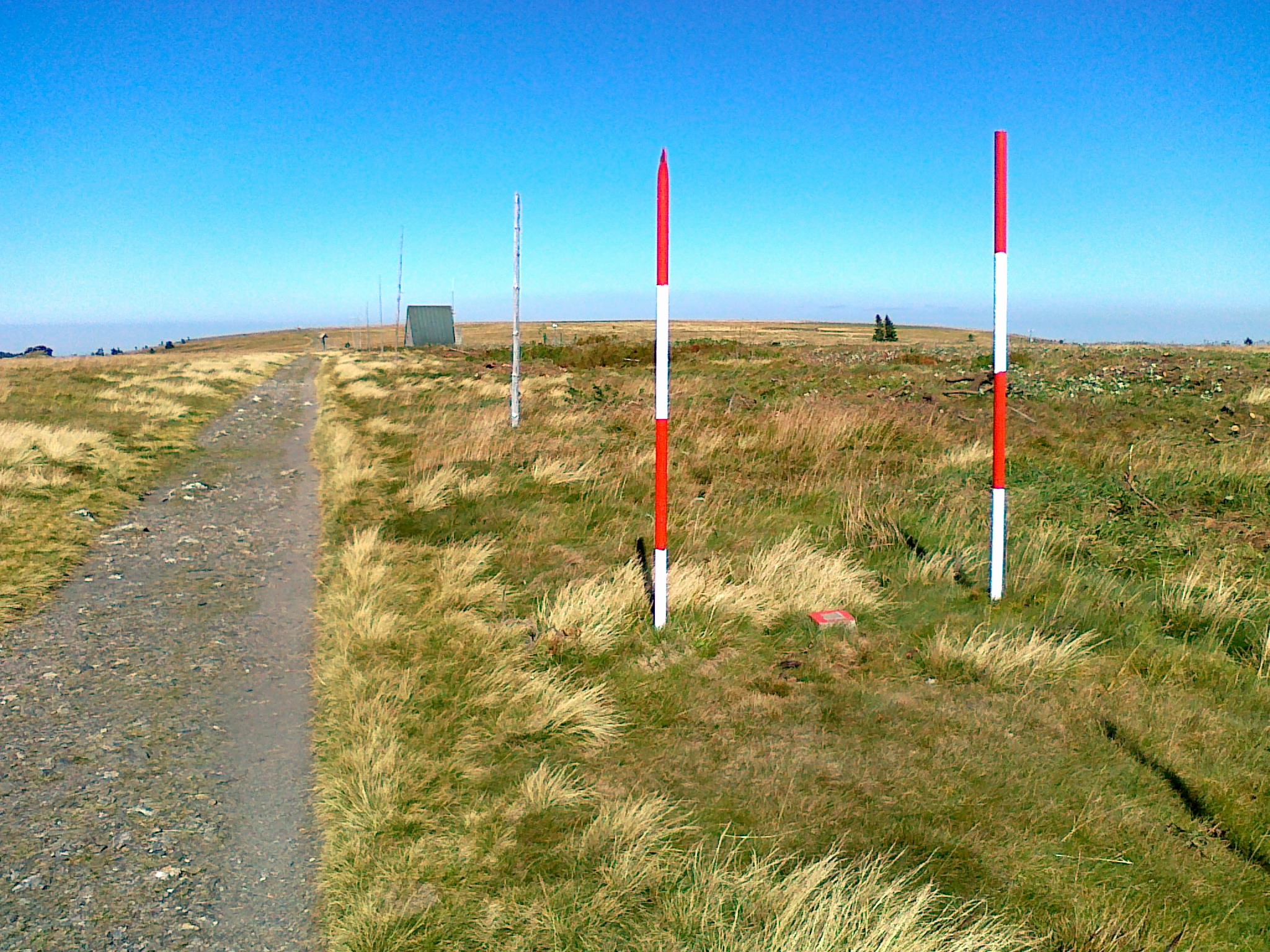
View from the main path to the mountain hut and the triangulation station on the secondary summit of Vysoká hole–JZ (in the distance the summit slope of Vysoká hole mountain)

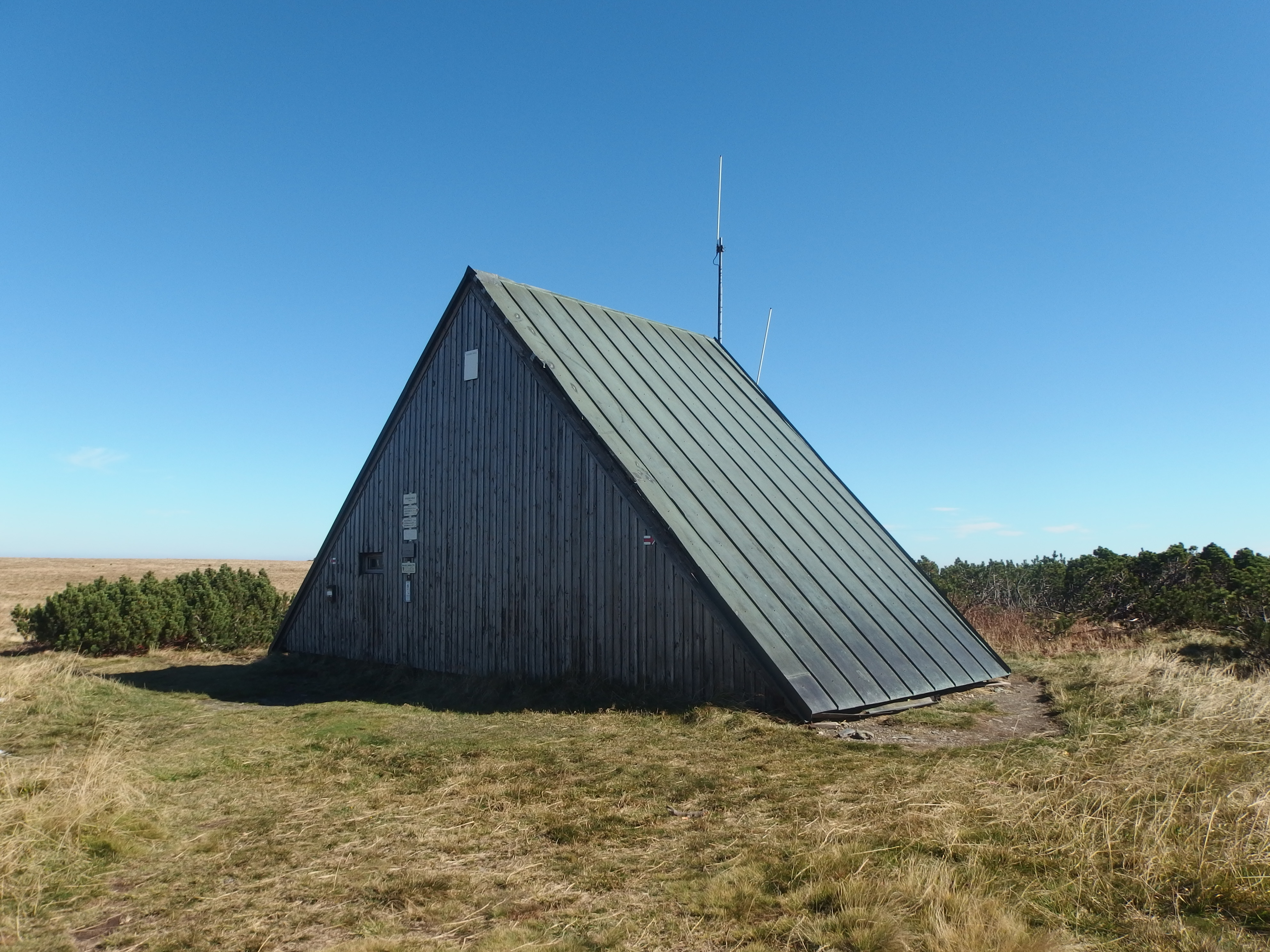
Wooden hut near the tourist stop called Vysoká hole

There are no marked hiking trails leading to the main summit. It is located amidst a plateau covered with alpine grass. The highest point of the mountain, at an altitude of 1,464.8 m (4,806 ft) above sea level, has geographic coordinates 50°03′45.48″N 17°14′08.17″E. On maps, another location recognized as the summit of the mountain is indicated, namely the main triangulation station of the mountain, marked on geodetic maps with the number 35 at an altitude of 1,463.67 m (4,802.1 ft) above sea level and geographic coordinates 50°03′43.68″N 17°14′11.11″E, marked with concrete circles for better location (the poles next to it have been broken), located about 87 m (285 ft) southeast of the main summit. The summit plateau is a prominent scenic viewpoint offering far-reaching perspectives.

The approximate approach to the main summit is from the red hiking trail, from which an indistinct, unmarked overgrown path leads through the summit plateau. Towards the Petrovy kameny peak, there is a pass called Sedlo u Petrových kamenů, located at an altitude of 1,432 m (4,698 ft) above sea level.

=== Secondary summit ===
Vysoká hole is a mountain with a double summit. At a distance of about 575 m (1,886 ft) southwest of the main summit, a secondary summit can be distinguished, designated as Vysoká hole–JZ, (Note: After World War II, the secondary summit of Vysoká hole–JZ was called Kamzičník.) with the same height as the main summit – 1,465 m (4,806 ft) above sea level, prominence of 4 m (13 ft), and geographic coordinates 50°03′31.04″N 17°13′49.43″E. At this location, there is a secondary triangulation station marked on geodetic maps with the number 211, at an altitude of 1,464.66 m (4,805.3 ft) above sea level, with two steel poles mounted nearby, located about 150 m (490 ft) southwest of the wooden hut at the tourist stop called Vysoká hole.

Both summit plateaus are connected by a main path, along which the red hiking trail runs, and by the highest, but less prominent (4 meters), pass of the Hrubý Jeseník chain at an altitude of 1,461 m (4,793 ft) above sea level. The plateau of the secondary summit is an outstanding scenic viewpoint offering views of the surrounding peaks and mountain ranges.

=== Geology ===
From a geological perspective, Vysoká hole mountain belongs to a unit known as the Vrbno layers and is composed of:

- metamorphic rocks, primarily blasto-mylonites, gneisses, phyllites, phyllonites (containing muscovite, biotite, and chlorite), greenschists;
- sedimentary rocks, primarily quartzites;
- igneous rocks, primarily meta-granitoids.

=== Waters ===
The mountain lies on the European watershed boundary, with the Baltic Sea basin (Oder river basin) on its eastern, northeastern, and southeastern slopes, and the Black Sea basin (Danube river basin) on its western slope. On the southeastern slope of the mountain, the Moravice river has its source, while the Bělokamenný Potok stream originates on the eastern slope, and the Desná river on the western slope.

== Nature preservation ==
Vysoká hole summit

Climate chart (precipitation, max. and min. temperature)
J	F	M	A	M	J	J	A	S	O	N	D
37 −6 −10	36 −5 −10	52 0 −7	65 6 −3	113 11 2	113 13 5	123 16 7	98 16 7	70 12 3	42 7 −1	49 0 −5	39 −5 −9
- █ Average max. and min. temperatures in °C
- █ Precipitation totals in mm
- Source: Klimat Vysoká hole. meteoblue.com
Imperial conversion
J	F	M	A	M	J	J	A	S	O	N	D
1.5 21 14	1.4 23 14	2 32 19	2.6 43 27	4.4 52 36	4.4 55 41	4.8 61 45	3.9 61 45	2.8 54 37	1.7 45 30	1.9 32 23	1.5 23 16
- █ Average max. and min. temperatures in °F
- █ Precipitation totals in inches

The entire flattened mountain top and the upper parts of its slopes are surrounded by the Praděd National Nature Reserve, established in 1991 and covering an area of approximately 2,031 ha (5,020 acres). This reserve was formed by merging six separate reserves: Petrovy kameny, Velká kotlina, Malá kotlina, Vrchol Pradědu, Divoký důl, and Bílá Opava. It is part of the protected area called the Jeseníky Protected Landscape Area, created to protect rock formations, terrain, vegetation, and rare animal species. On the southeastern slope of the mountain lies the Velká kotlina nature reserve.

=== Educational trails ===
To protect the unique ecosystem within the reserve, the Velká kotlina educational trail was established in 1971 along the blue hiking trail, with a length of 5.5 km (3.4 mi) from Karlov pod Pradědem to Nad Ovčárnou, with 7 observation posts along the route.

Additionally, another educational trail was marked along the main ridge in 2009, called Naučná stezka Po hřebenech – světem horských luk trail. It spans 12 km (7.5 mi) from Ovčárna to Skřítek and includes twelve observation points along the route.

=== Velká kotlina valley ===
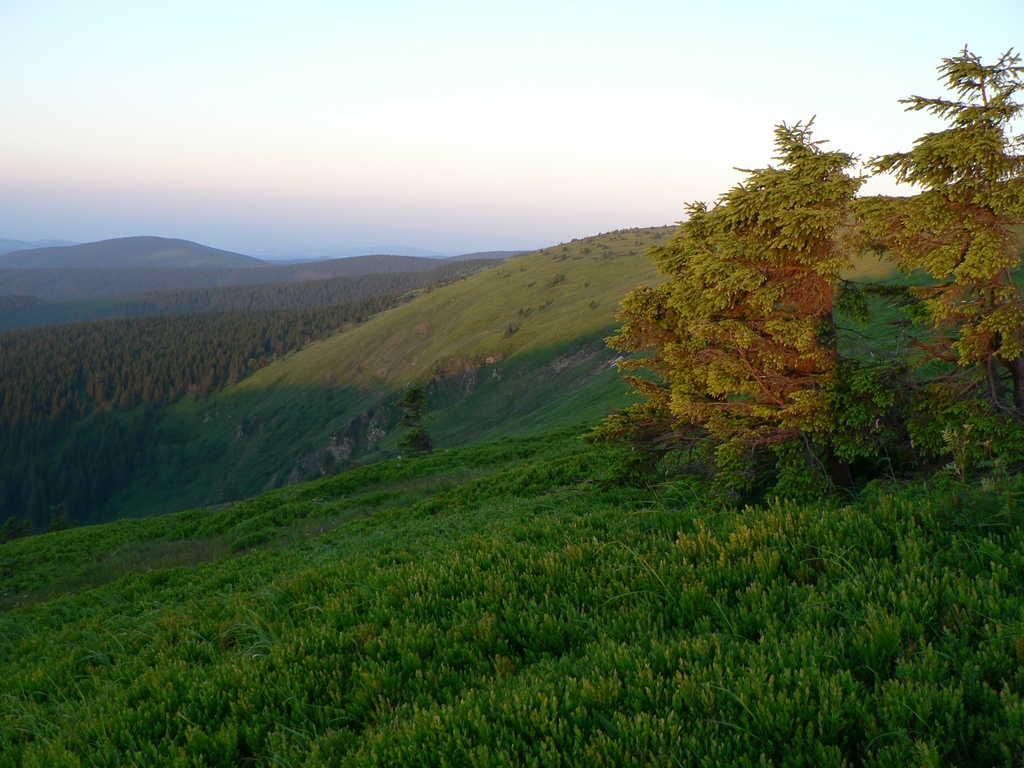
View of the Velká kotlina nature reserve

The Velká kotlina valley, which is part of the Praděd National Nature Reserve, formes the most valuable botanical clusters in the Sudetes, the Czech Republic, and even in Central Europe as a whole, with numerous rare plant species. On the southeastern slope of the mountain, there is a cirque characterized by steep walls, rocky outcrops, couloirs, and small streams cascading down, forming small waterfalls. The area is home to both mountain and lowland vegetation, including tundra plants, warm-loving plants, and spring vegetation, totaling around 450 species (some unique). Notable species include wolf's-bane, garden monkshood, Adenostyles alliariae, green spleenwort, alpine aster, alpine lady-fern, bistort, Calamagrostis arundinacea, Calamagrostis villosa, bearded bellflower, Buxbaum's sedge, stemless carline thistle, alpine sow-thistle, Conioselinum tataricum, common spotted orchid, alpine delphinium, fringed pink, yellow foxglove, Doronicum austriacum, round-leaved sundew, common cottongrass, Euphrasia picta, Festuca varia, spotted gentian, Omalotheca norvegica, fragrant orchid, alpine sainfoin, fox-and-cubs, Hypochaeris uniflora, Juncus trifidus, martagon lily, marsh grass of Parnassu, common butterwort, alpine meadow-grass, northern hollyfern, large-flowered selfheal, large white buttercup, golden root, Sedum alpestre, Thesium alpinum, round headed orchid, alpine bulrush, chickweed-wintergreen, Trollius altissimus, false helleborine or Viola lutea.

German botanist of Polish origin, Henryk Emanuel Grabowski, made significant contributions to exploring the charm of the reserve. The reserve is also home to many valuable and protected animals, including chamois, which was introduced here from the Alps in 1913. Velká kotlina is an area where snow Avalanches may occur during snowy periods, and the snow cover can last until almost June.

== Tourism ==
Within the mountain itself, there are no mountain huts or hotels. A key tourist point on the mountain is the tourist crossroads located approximately 560 m (1,840 ft) northeast of the summit, called Nad Ovčárnou, with an indicated elevation of 1,368 m (4,488 ft). This crossroads serves as a junction for hiking trails and educational paths.

=== Boundary marker ===
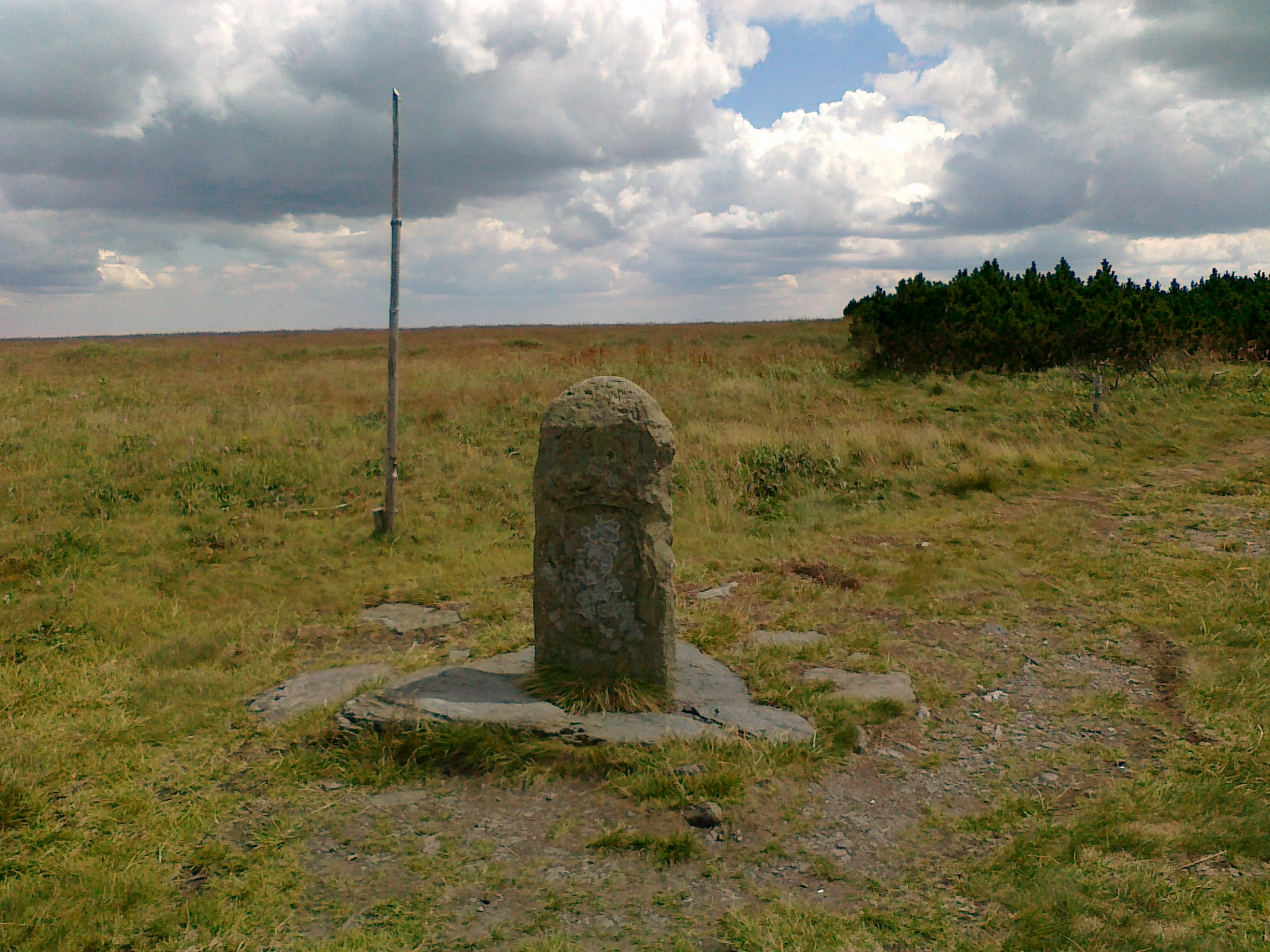
Boundary marker

Vysoká hole is located on the historical border between Silesia and Moravia, marked by a sandstone boundary marker standing about 430 m (1,410 ft) southwest of the summit, dating back to 1681. This marker also marked the borders of three feudal estates that converged here: the Teutonic Order from Bruntál, the Velké Losiny estate, and the Janovice estate.

=== Hunting huts ===
Two huts are located on the slopes of the mountain, but they do not have the character of typical mountain huts. They are classified as so-called hunting huts.

Huts on the slopes of Vysoká hole mountain
Number	Hut	Distance from the summit in meters	Location	Geographical coordinates
1	Eustachova chata	1830 to the east	southeastern slope, close to the pass towards Temná mountain	50°03′33.4″N 17°15′21.9″E
2	Jelení chata (1) (Note: Indexed designation in contrast to two other huts of the same name located in the same range: the Jelení chata (2) located on the slope of Keprník mountain and the Jelení chata (3) located on the slope of Orlík mountain.)	1300 to the southeast	southeastern slope, close to the Velká kotlina basin	50°03′03.5″N 17°14′31.4″E

=== Hiking trails ===
The Czech Tourist Club has established four hiking trails within the mountain on trails:

- Red trail: Červenohorské sedlo – Velký Klínovec mountain – Hřebenová pass – Výrovka summit – Sedlo pod Malým Jezerníkem pass – Malý Jezerník summit – Velký Jezerník mountain – Sedlo Velký Jezerník pass – Švýcárna mountain hut – Praděd mountain – U Barborky pass – Petrovy kameny mountain – Ovčárna – Sedlo u Petrových kamenů pass – Vysoká hole mountain – Vysoká hole–JZ summit – Kamzičník summit – Velký Máj mountain – Sedlo nad Malým kotlem pass – Jelení hřbet mountain – Jelení studánka – Sedlo pod Jelení studánkou pass – Jelenka mountain – Ostružná mountain – Rýmařov
- Yellow trail: Karlova Studánka – Bílá Opava stream valley – Ostrý vrch mountain – waterfalls of Bílá Opava – Petrovy kameny mountain – Ovčárna – Vysoká hole mountain – Temná mountain – Kopřivná mountain – Karlov pod Pradědem – Malá Morávka
- Green trail: Kouty nad Desnou – Hřbety mountain – Nad Petrovkou mountain – Kamzík – Velký Jezerník mountain – Sedlo Velký Jezerník pass – Švýcárna mountain hut – Praděd mountain – Petrovy kameny mountain – Ovčárna – Vysoká hole mountain – Hradečná mountain – Karlova Studánka
- Blue trail: Karlova Studánka – Bílá Opava valley – Ostrý vrch mountain – Barborka mountain hut – U Barborky pass – Petrovy kameny mountain – Ovčárna – Vysoká hole mountain – Velká kotlina – Moravice river valley – Karlov pod Pradědem – Malá Morávka

=== Cycling routes ===
A cycling route also passes through the northeastern slope of the mountain on the route:

Červenohorské sedlo – Velký Klínovec mountain – Výrovka mountain – Kamzík – Velký Jezerník mountain – Sedlo Velký Jezerník pass – Švýcárna mountain hut – Praděd mountain – U Barborky pass – Petrovy kameny mountain – Ovčárna – Vysoká hole mountain – Hradečná mountain – Hvězda pass Hvězda pass – Praděd: (length: 9.1 km, altitude difference: 632 m, average ascent gradient: 6,9%)

=== Cross-country skiing routes ===
During snowy periods, three cross-country skiing routes set by the mountain can be used: Hvězda pass – Hradečná mountain – Vysoká hole mountain – Temná mountain – Jelení cesta Hvězda pass – Hradečná mountain – Vysoká hole mountain – Temná mountain – Kopřivná mountain – Karlov pod Pradědem – Malá Morávka

In addition, an educational trail (Czech: NS Po hřebenech - světem horských luk), the so-called Jesenická magistrála, runs along the main path.

Near the Sedlo u Petrových kamenů pass, four pistes of varying degrees of difficulty are located with two platter lifts:

Pistes with lifts from the slope of Vysoká hole mountain
Number	Route and signage	Length of route in meters	Height difference in meters	Type of lift	Length of lift m
1	1	760	143	platter lift	540
2	2	610	143	platter lift	540
3	3	600	125	platter lift	590
4	4	600	125	platter lift	590

== Bibliography ==
- Banaszkiewicz, Piotr; Parzewski, Jerzy (2019). Jesioniki, Góry Opawskie. Mapa turystyczna: skala 1:50 000 (in Polish and Czech) (1st ed.). Kraków: Wydawnictwo Kartograficzne "Compass". ISBN 9788376059419. OCLC 1150586280. Archived from the original on 17 January 2021.
- Brygier, Waldemar (2017). Jesioniki. Pradziad, Jeseník: skala 1:40 000 (in Polish and Czech) (4th ed.). Wrocław: Studio Plan. ISBN 9788365689757. OCLC 1036547484.
- Cymerman, Zbigniew (1998). "Spory o podział geologiczny Sudetów". Przegląd Geologiczny. 46 (6). ISSN 0033-2151. OCLC 995455330. Archived from the original on 11 December 2018.
- "Historie jesenické přírody" (PDF). jeseniky.ochranaprirody.cz (in Czech). Archived from the original (PDF) on 13 November 2021.
- Kučera, Jan (2009). "Bryoflora of selected localites of the Hrubý Jeseník Mts summit regions" (PDF). botanika.prf.jcu.cz. Archived from the original (PDF) on 3 November 2020.
- Steffanová, Petra (2010). Morfologie údolního uzávěru Moravice. Hrubý Jeseník (PDF) (Thesis) (in Czech). Prague: Univerzita Karlova v Praze. Přírodovědecká fakulta. Katedra fyzické geografie a geoekologie. Archived (PDF) from the original on 20 March 2022 – via dspace.cuni.cz.
