= Valšov–Rýmařov railway =

Railway line in the Czech Republic

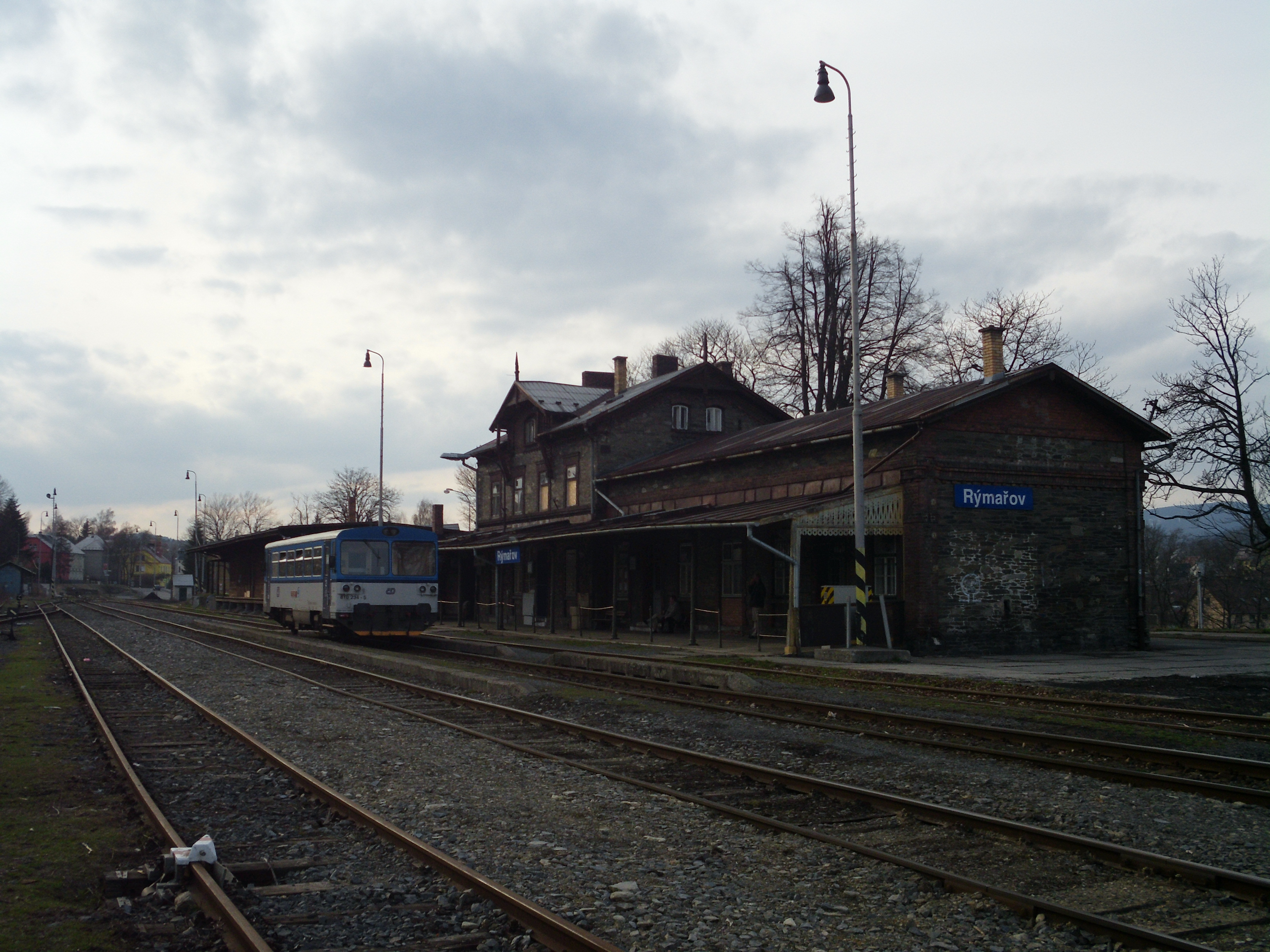
- Rýmařov station in 2012

Overview
- Line number: 311
- Locale: Czech Republic
- Termini: Valšov; Rýmařov

Service
- Operator(s): České dráhy

History
- Opened: 18 October 1878

Technical
- Line length: 14.083 km (8.751 mi)
- Track gauge: 1,435 mm (4 ft 8 1/2 in) standard gauge
- Operating speed: 50 km/h (31 mph)

The Valšov–Rýmařov railway is a commuter rail line in the Czech Republic. It was built and primarily operated by Imperial Royal Austrian State Railways (kkStB) as Staatsbahn Kriegsdorf–Römerstadt. It was divided from Bahnstrecke Olomouc–Opava východ at Valšov to the direction of Jeseník and Rýmařov.

== History ==
On 21 April 1871 Moravskoslezsky Centralbahnplatz (MSCB) gained the concession to build a railway main line from Olomouc to Głubczyce via Krnov and the border. The concession included the rights for building branch lines from Město Albrechtice via Nysa, Opava, Rýmařov to Vrbno pod Pradědem. The onset of the Long Depression financially blocked the building of the line. It was the background when Austria wanted to connect Valšov and Rýmařov for itself (as had happened for the Milotice nad Opavou–Vrbno pod Pradědem railway).

The line was opened on 18 October 1878. At the beginning it was operated by the MSCB. On 1 January 1895 it was handed over to the Imperial Royal Austrian Railways.

The 1912 timetable included 4 pairs of railways on the line. It took 39–56 minutes for the trains to traverse the 14 km.

When Austria-Hungary lost in World War I, the line was handed over to the newly founded Czechoslovak State Railways (ČSD). In 1920 the trains were operated more frequently and running time was decreased to 30.37 minutes. The Winter timetable of 1937–1939 included one extra train, which stopped at all the stations.

When Nazi Germany annexed Sudetenland, the line became part of the German territory and it was owned and operated by Deutsche Reichsbahn. In the Reich timetable it was called line 151w, Kriegsdorf–Römerstadt. At the end of World War II line was passed back to ČSD.

On 1 January 1993 the line and its trains became part of the newly founded České dráhy.

The 2012 timetable included 10 pairs of trains every day, except Sunday. Later, this was reduced to eight pairs of trains. Most of the trains run between Esko v Moravskoslezském kraji and Opava východ. It takes about 24–25 minutes, with a 34 km/h travelling speed.

== Description of the line ==
The rails run from south of Valšov's station. After crossing the river Moravice, the line runs on the right bank to the west to Rýmařov.
