= Moravice (river) =

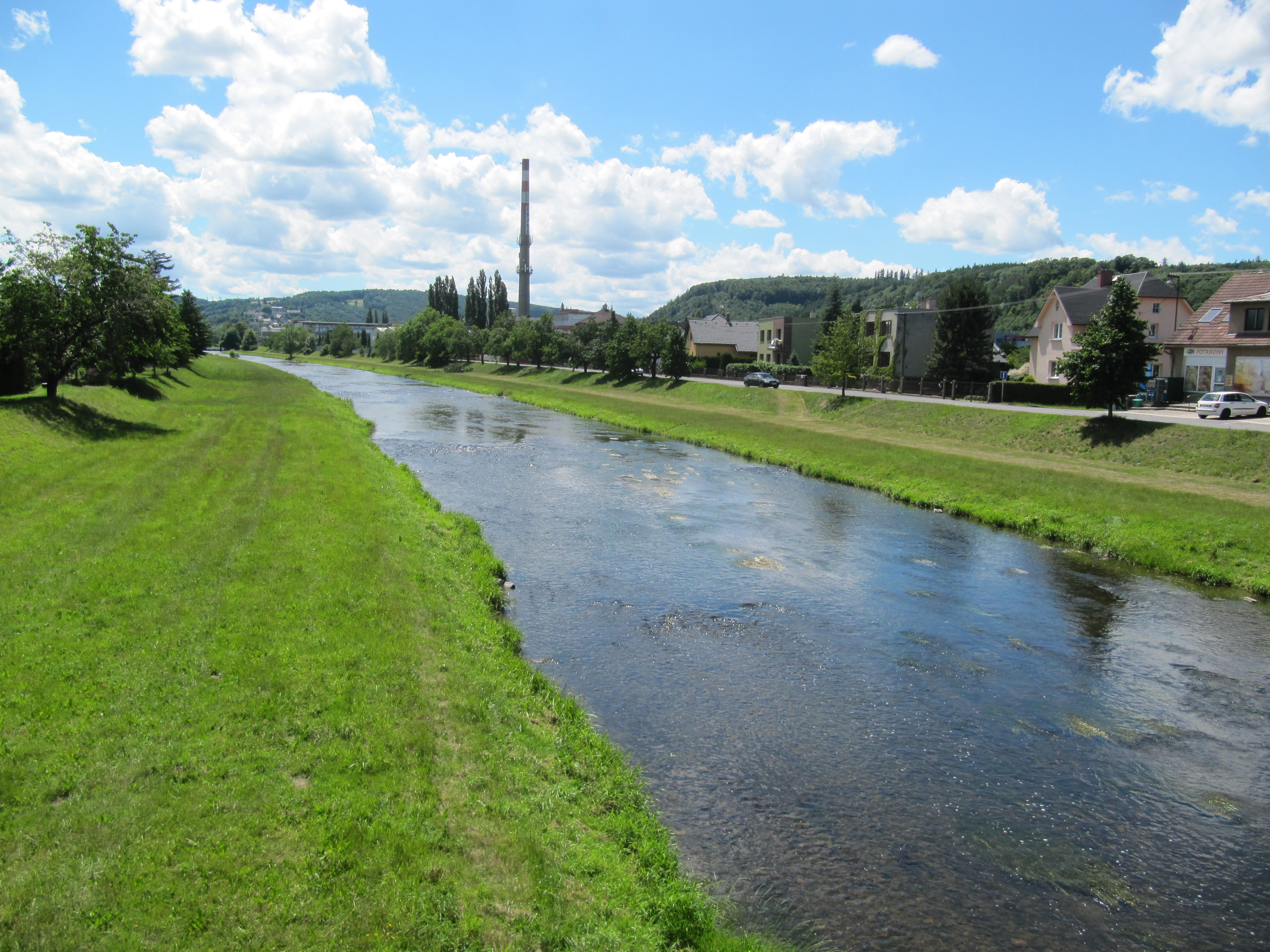
- The Moravice in Branka u Opavy

Location
- Country: Czech Republic
- Region: Moravian-Silesian

Physical characteristics
- Source
  - location: Malá Morávka, Hrubý Jeseník
  - coordinates: 50°3′31″N 17°14′5″E
  - elevation: 1,422 m (4,665 ft)
- Mouth
  - location: Opava
  - coordinates: 49°55′39″N 17°56′45″E
  - elevation: 242 m (794 ft)
- Length: 100.5 km (62.4 mi)
- Basin size: 899.9 km^{2} (347.5 sq mi)
- Discharge
  - average: 7.82 m^{3}/s (276 cu ft/s) near estuary

Basin features
- Progression: Opava→ Oder→ Baltic Sea

The Moravice (Czech pronunciation: [ˈmoravɪtsɛ]; German: Mohra) is a river in the Czech Republic, a right tributary of the Opava River. It flows through the Moravian-Silesian Region. It is 100.5 km (62.4 mi) long, making it the 25th longest river in the Czech Republic.

== Characteristic ==
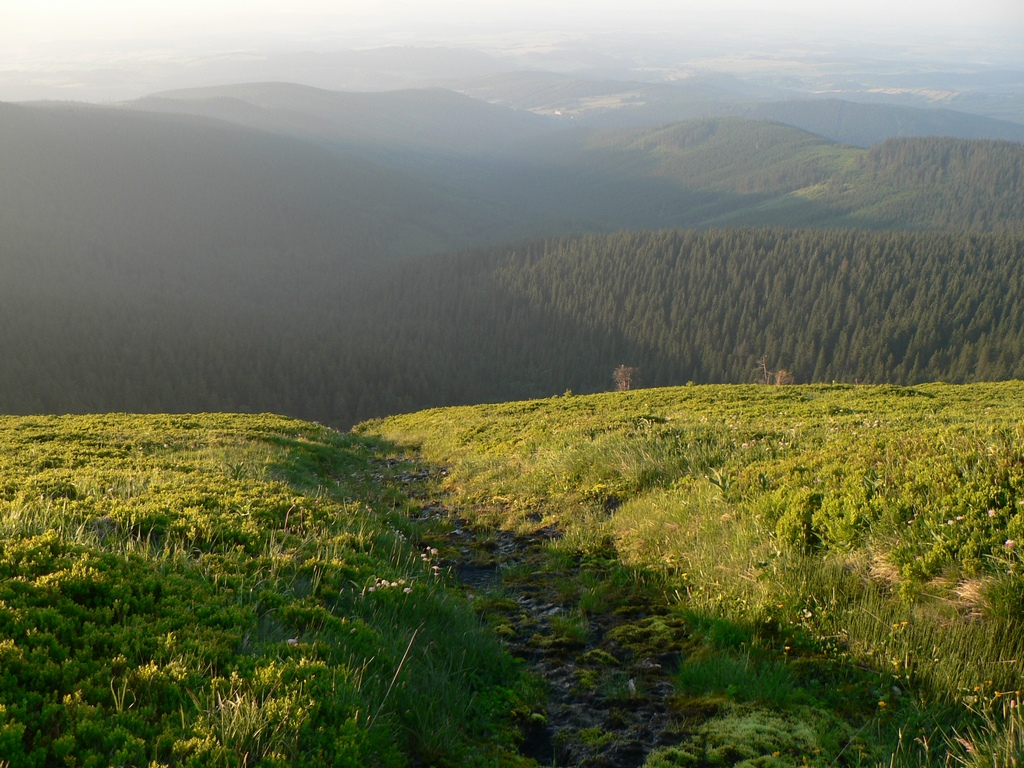
Spring of the Moravice

The Moravice originates in the territory of Malá Morávka in the Hrubý Jeseník range at an elevation of 1,422 m (4,665 ft), on the slope of Vysoká hole Mountain. It flows to Opava, where it enters the Opava River at an elevation of 242 m (794 ft). It is 100.5 km (62.4 mi) long, making it the 25th longest river in the Czech Republic. Its drainage basin has an area of 899.9 km^{2} (347.5 sq mi).

The longest tributaries of the Moravice are:

Tributary	Length (km)	River km	Side
Hvozdnice	36.5	5.3	left
Černý potok	25.0	70.3	left
Podolský potok	21.4	85.5	right
Lobník	16.9	47.1	right
Kočovský potok	15.9	74.8	left
Meleček	10.2	12.3	left

== Course ==
The river partially forms the historical border between Moravia and Silesia. Apart from the outskirts of the city of Opava, the river does not flow through any large settlement; the largest town directly on the river is Břidličná. The river flows through the municipal territories of Malá Morávka, Dolní Moravice, Malá Štáhle, Velká Štáhle, Břidličná, Valšov, Nová Pláň, Roudno, Leskovec nad Moravicí, Bílčice, Jakartovice, Kružberk, Staré Těchanovice, Moravice, Melč, Vítkov, Radkov, Hradec nad Moravicí, Branka u Opavy and Opava.

== Bodies of water ==
The Slezská Harta with an area and Kružberk reservoirs are constructed on the river. There are 336 bodies of water in the basin area.

== Tourism ==
The Moravice is suitable for river tourism and is the most favorite river in the Moravian-Silesian Region for paddlers. The lower course is navigable all year round. The upper course is navigable after rains, melting, or after water is released from reservoirs.
