= Břidličná =

- Town
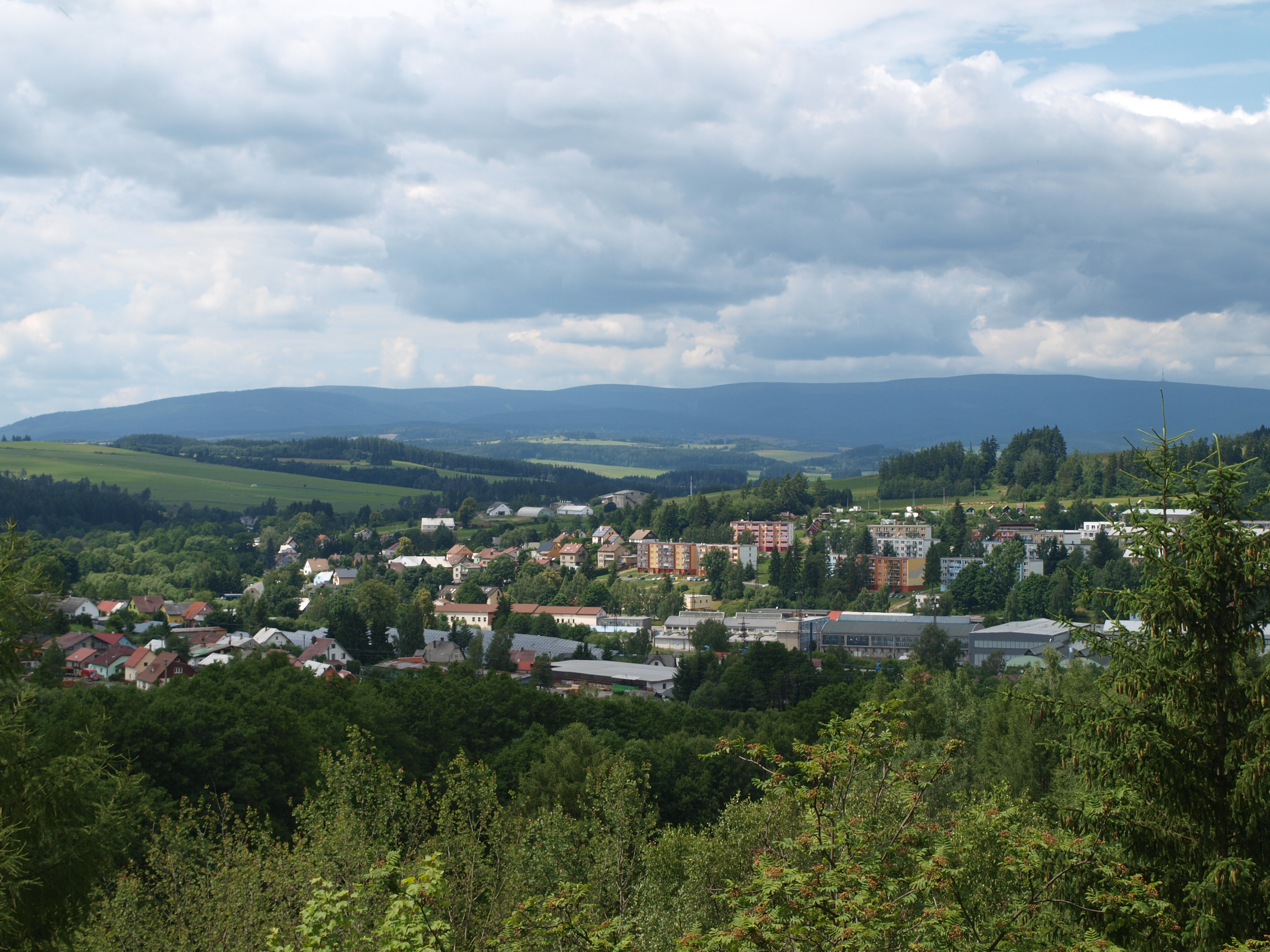
- View from the southeast

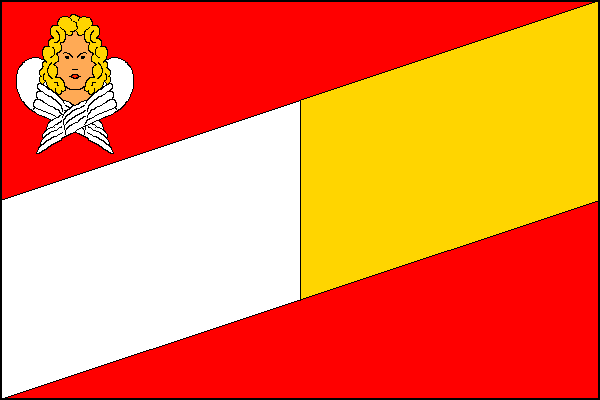
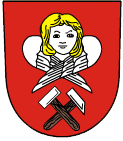
- Flag Coat of arms

- Location in the Czech Republic
- Coordinates: 49°54′50″N 17°22′25″E
- Country: Czech Republic
- Region: Moravian-Silesian
- District: Bruntál
- First mentioned: 1490

Government
  - Mayor: Miroslav Kladníček

Area
  - Total: 25.81 km^{2} (9.97 sq mi)
- Elevation: 535 m (1,755 ft)

Population (2026-01-01)
  - Total: 2,843
  - Density: 110.2/km^{2} (285.3/sq mi)
- Time zone: UTC+1 (CET)
  - Summer (DST): UTC+2 (CEST)
- Postal code: 793 51
- Website: www.mu-bridlicna.cz

Břidličná (Czech pronunciation: [ˈbr̝ɪdlɪtʃnaː]; until 1950 Frýdlant nad Moravicí, German: Friedland an der Mohra) is a town in Bruntál District in the Moravian-Silesian Region of the Czech Republic. It has about 2,800 inhabitants.

== Administrative division ==
Břidličná consists of three municipal parts (in brackets population according to the 2021 census):

- Břidličná (2,650)
- Albrechtice u Rýmařova (35)
- Vajglov (147)

== Etymology ==
Until 1950, the town was called Frýdlant nad Moravicí. In 1950, the name was changed to Břidličná (an adjective from břidlice, i.e. 'slate', 'shale').

== Geography ==
Břidličná is located about 10 kilometres (6 mi) southeast of Bruntál and 35 km (22 mi) north of Olomouc. It lies in the Nízký Jeseník range. The highest point is at 701 m (2,300 ft) above sea level. The town is situated on both banks of the Moravice River.

== History ==
The settlement of Skalka, which was a possible predecessor of Břidličná, was first mentioned in a document from 1320. The name Frýdlant nad Moravicí was first mentioned in 1490. In 1950, the name of the town was changed to Břidličná. The town status was returned to Břidličná in 1973.

== Demographics ==
Historical population

Year	Pop.	±%
1869	2,571	—
1880	2,313	−10.0%
1890	2,114	−8.6%
1900	2,153	+1.8%
1910	2,260	+5.0%

Year	Pop.	±%
1921	2,027	−10.3%
1930	2,167	+6.9%
1950	1,932	−10.8%
1961	2,520	+30.4%
1970	3,368	+33.7%

Year	Pop.	±%
1980	3,698	+9.8%
1991	4,013	+8.5%
2001	3,811	−5.0%
2011	3,222	−15.5%
2021	2,832	−12.1%

Source: Censuses

== Transport ==
Břidličná is located on the railway line Opava–Rýmařov. The town is served by three train stations: Břidličná, Břidličná zastávka and Břidličná lesy.

== Sights ==
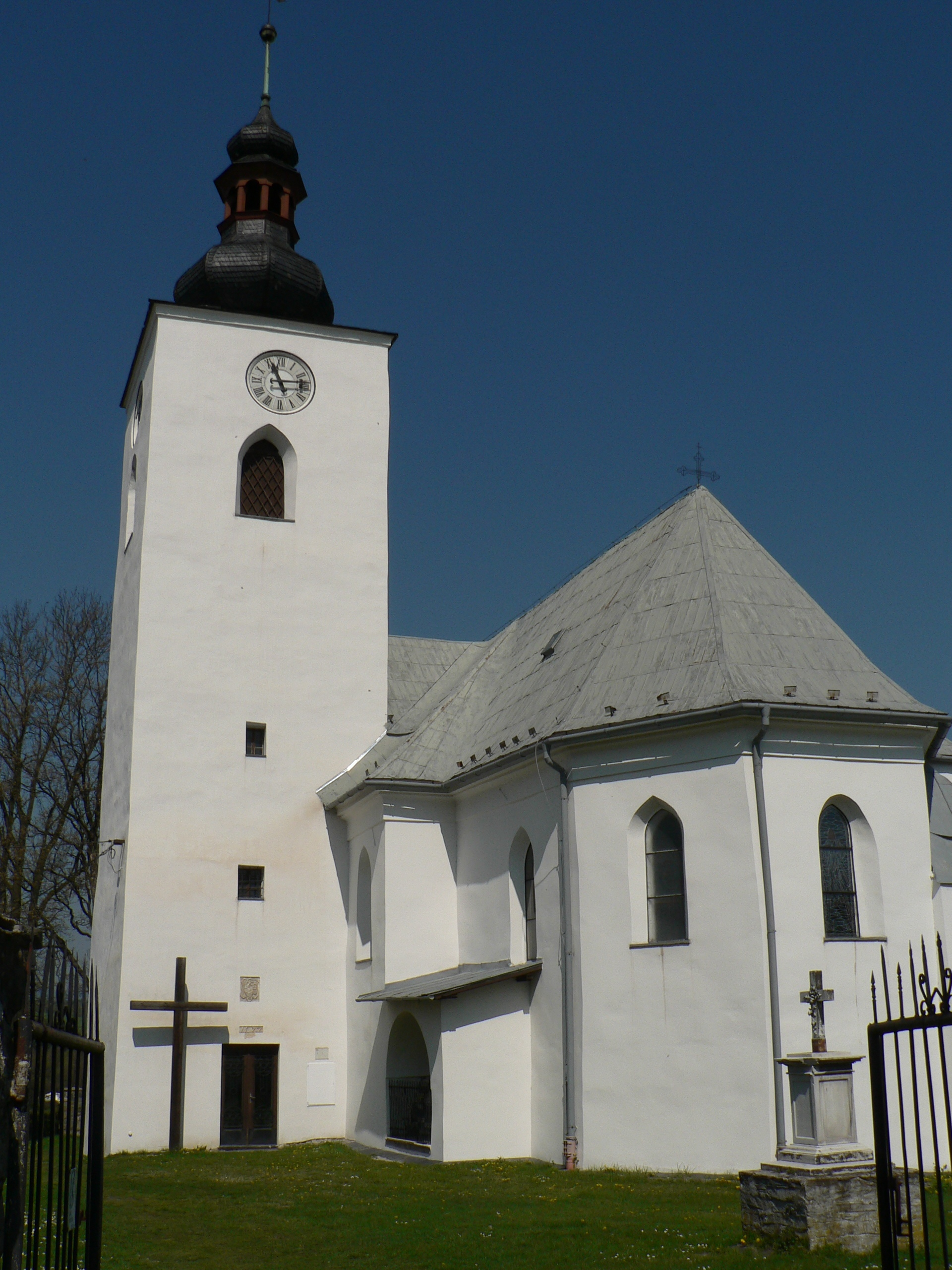
Church of the Three Wise Men

The main landmark of Břidličná is the Church of the Three Wise Men. It was built in 1577 and modified in 1610. It is a valuable building with preserved authentic Renaissance, Baroque and Neoclassical constructions.
