= Jakartovice =

- Municipality
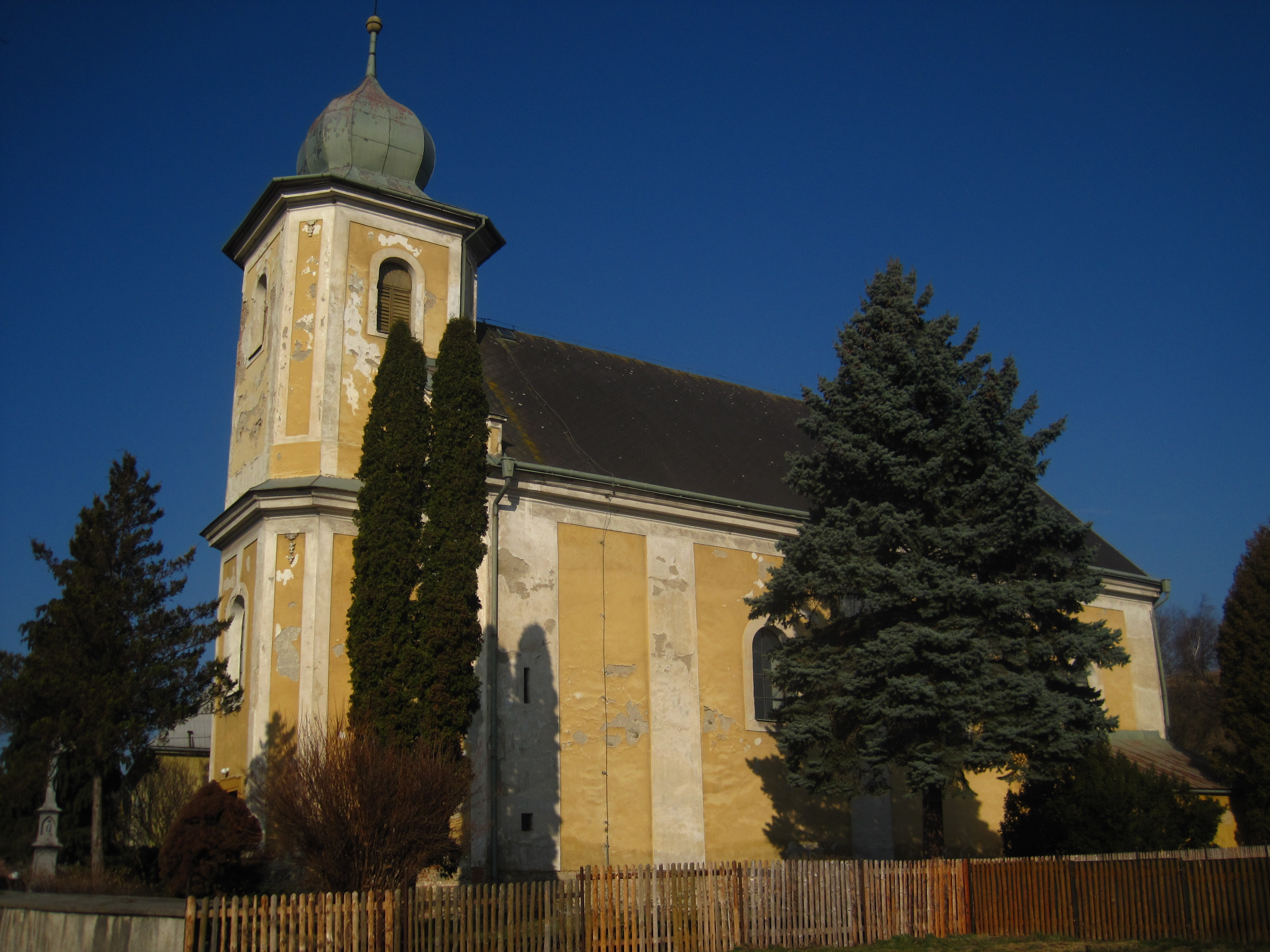
- Church of the Nativity of the Virgin Mary

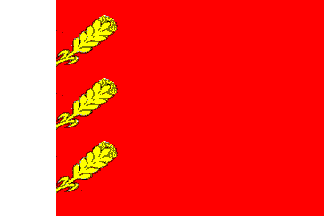
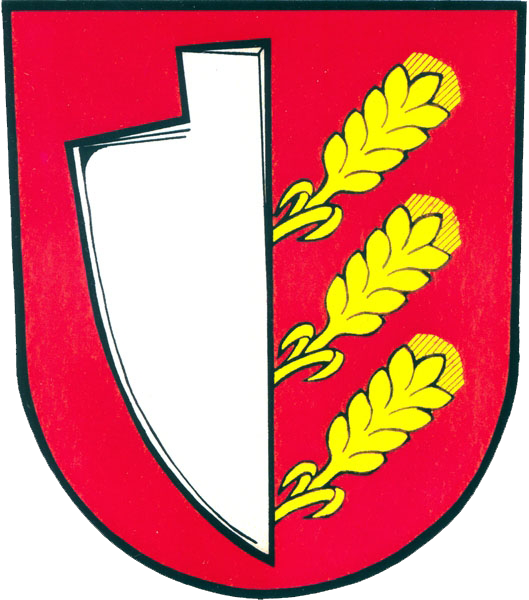
- Flag Coat of arms

- Location in the Czech Republic
- Coordinates: 49°54′54″N 17°41′3″E
- Country: Czech Republic
- Region: Moravian-Silesian
- District: Opava
- First mentioned: 1250

Area
  - Total: 50.04 km^{2} (19.32 sq mi)
- Elevation: 356 m (1,168 ft)

Population (2026-01-01)
  - Total: 1,063
  - Density: 21.24/km^{2} (55.02/sq mi)
- Time zone: UTC+1 (CET)
  - Summer (DST): UTC+2 (CEST)
- Postal code: 747 53
- Website: www.jakartovice.cz

Jakartovice (German: Eckersdorf, Polish: Jakartowice) is a municipality and village in Opava District in the Moravian-Silesian Region of the Czech Republic. It has about 1,100 inhabitants.

== Administrative division ==
Jakartovice consists of four municipal parts (in brackets population according to the 2021 census):

- Jakartovice (356)
- Bohdanovice (200)
- Deštné (324)
- Hořejší Kunčice (139)

== Geography ==
Jakartovice is located about 14 kilometres (9 mi) west of Opava and 38 km (24 mi) west of Ostrava. It lies in the Nízký Jeseník range. The highest point is at 563 m (1,847 ft) above sea level. The southern municipal border is formed by the Kružberk Reservoir, built on the Moravice River.

== History ==
The first written mention of Jakartovice is from 1250. Bohdanovice was first mentioned in 1265, Deštné at the beginning of the 14th century and Hořejší Kunčice in 1403.

In 1974 the villages of Bohdanovice, Deštné, Hořejší Kunčice, and the territory of former villages of Kerhartice and Medlice were joined to Jakartovice and since then they make up one municipality.

== Demographics ==
Historical population

Year	Pop.	±%
1869	3,451	—
1880	3,699	+7.2%
1890	3,661	−1.0%
1900	3,504	−4.3%
1910	3,113	−11.2%

Year	Pop.	±%
1921	2,843	−8.7%
1930	2,830	−0.5%
1950	1,475	−47.9%
1961	1,495	+1.4%
1970	1,248	−16.5%

Year	Pop.	±%
1980	1,118	−10.4%
1991	976	−12.7%
2001	1,060	+8.6%
2011	1,077	+1.6%
2021	1,019	−5.4%

Source: Censuses

== Transport ==
The I/46 road from Olomouc to Opava runs through the municipality.

Jakartovice is located on the railway line Opava–Svobodné Heřmanice, but trains run on it only on weekends and holidays during the summer season.

== Sights ==
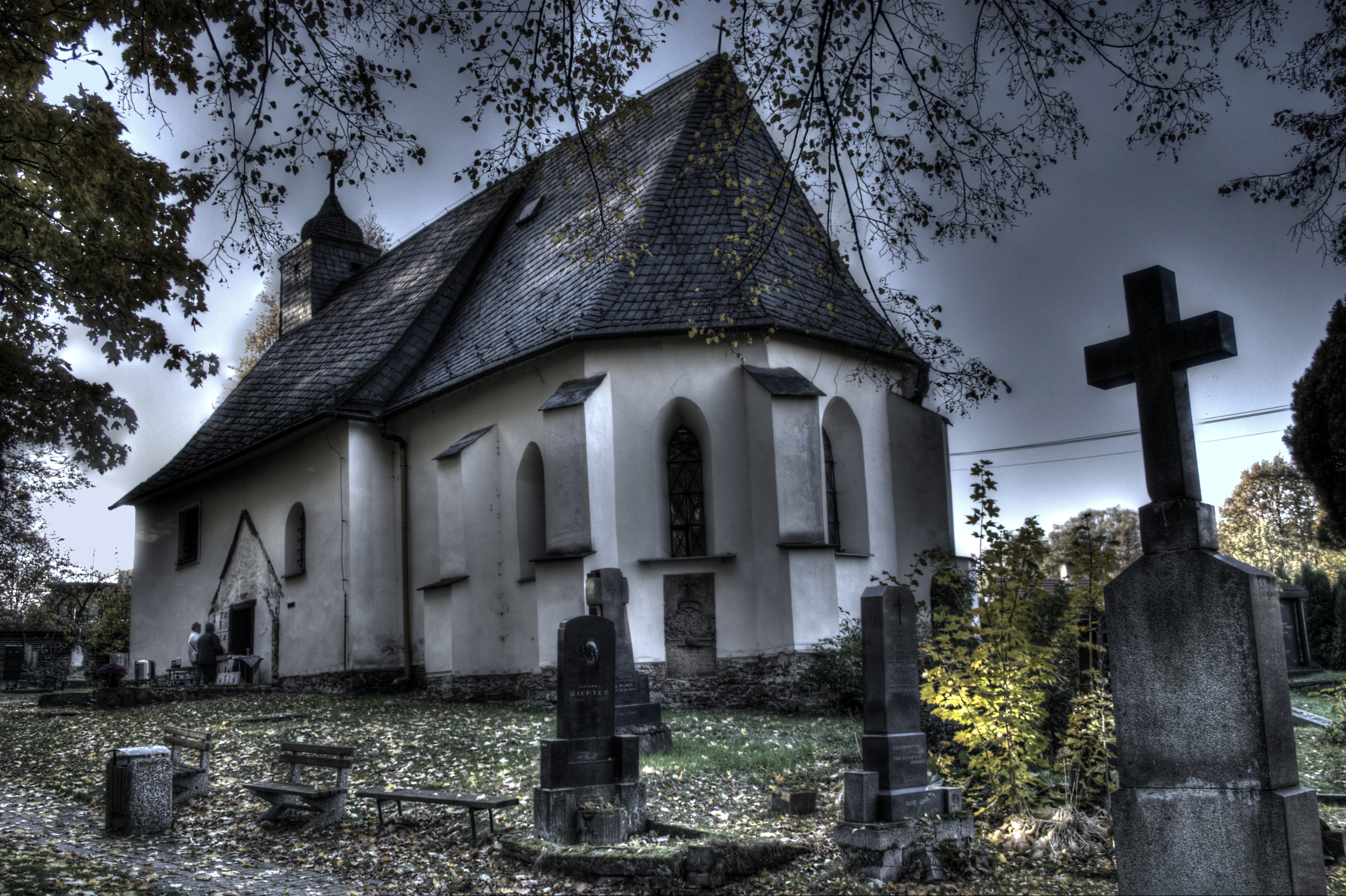
Church of the Visitation of Our Lady

The most valuable buildings are the Church of the Nativity of the Virgin Mary, built in the Baroque style in 1755, and the complex of historic buildings in Deštné – the Deštné Castle with a park and the Church of the Visitation of Our Lady. The Baroque castle dates from the 18th century (rebuilt from a fortress from 1408). The church was built in the Gothic style in the second half of the 14th century.
