= Moravice, Czech Republic =

Moravice
- Municipality
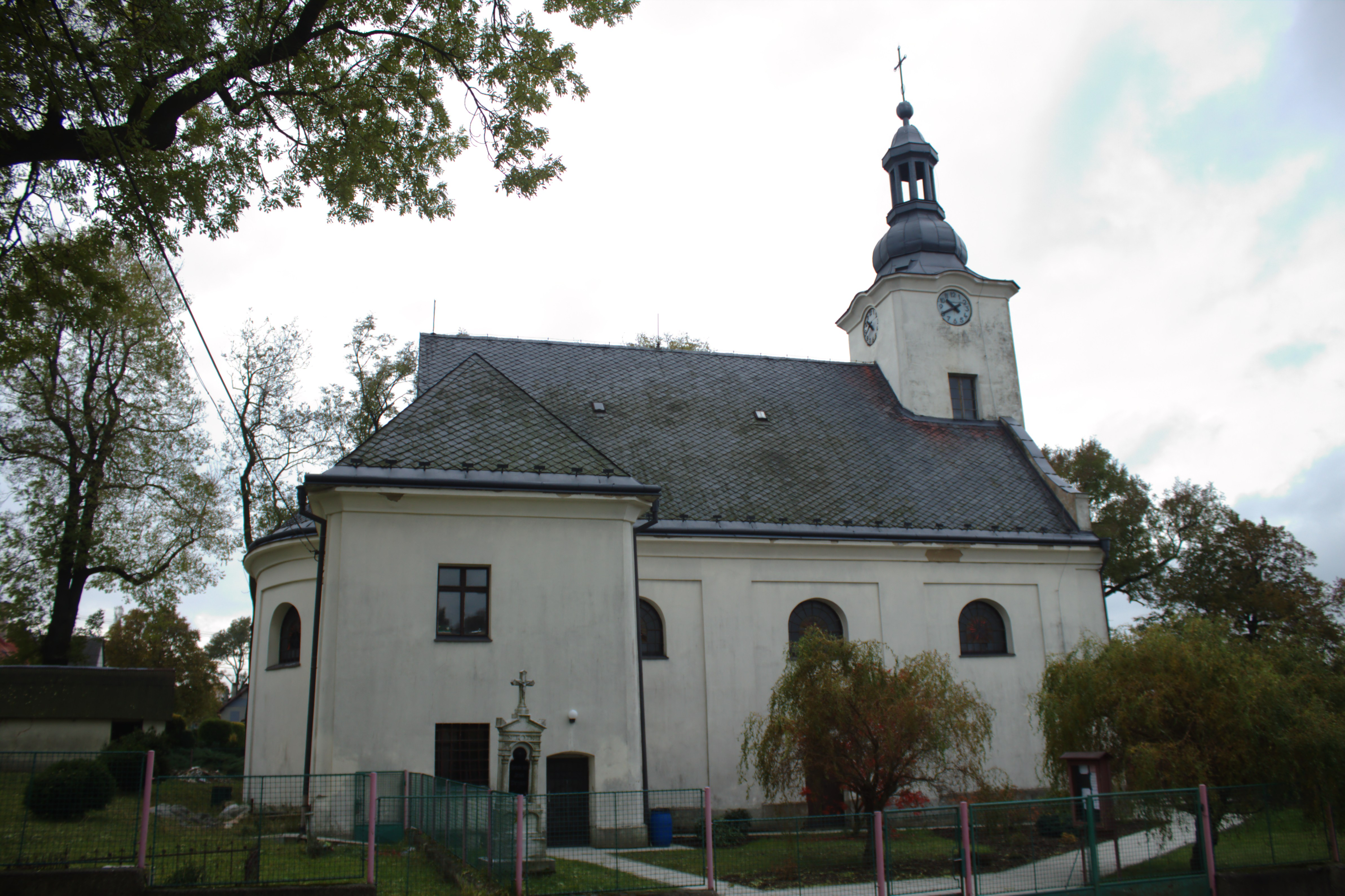
- Church of Saints Philip and James

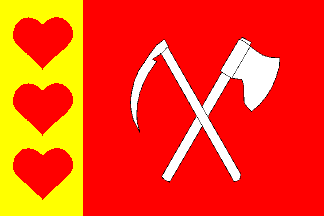
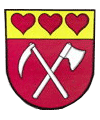
- Flag Coat of arms

- Location in the Czech Republic
- Coordinates: 49°51′28″N 17°43′13″E
- Country: Czech Republic
- Region: Moravian-Silesian
- District: Opava
- First mentioned: 1283

Area
  - Total: 11.11 km^{2} (4.29 sq mi)
- Elevation: 547 m (1,795 ft)

Population (2026-01-01)
  - Total: 240
  - Density: 22/km^{2} (56/sq mi)
- Time zone: UTC+1 (CET)
  - Summer (DST): UTC+2 (CEST)
- Postal code: 747 84
- Website: www.obecmoravice.cz

Moravice (German: Morawitz) is a municipality and village in Opava District in the Moravian-Silesian Region of the Czech Republic. It has about 200 inhabitants. It lies on the left bank of the Moravice River.

== Demographics ==
Historical population
Year	Pop.	±%
1869	728	—
1880	719	−1.2%
1890	667	−7.2%
1900	650	−2.5%
1910	626	−3.7%
1921	603	−3.7%
1930	543	−10.0%
1950	411	−24.3%
1961	372	−9.5%
1970	303	−18.5%
1980	296	−2.3%
1991	296	+0.0%
2001	265	−10.5%
2011	240	−9.4%
2021	226	−5.8%
Source: Censuses
