= Kružberk =

- Municipality
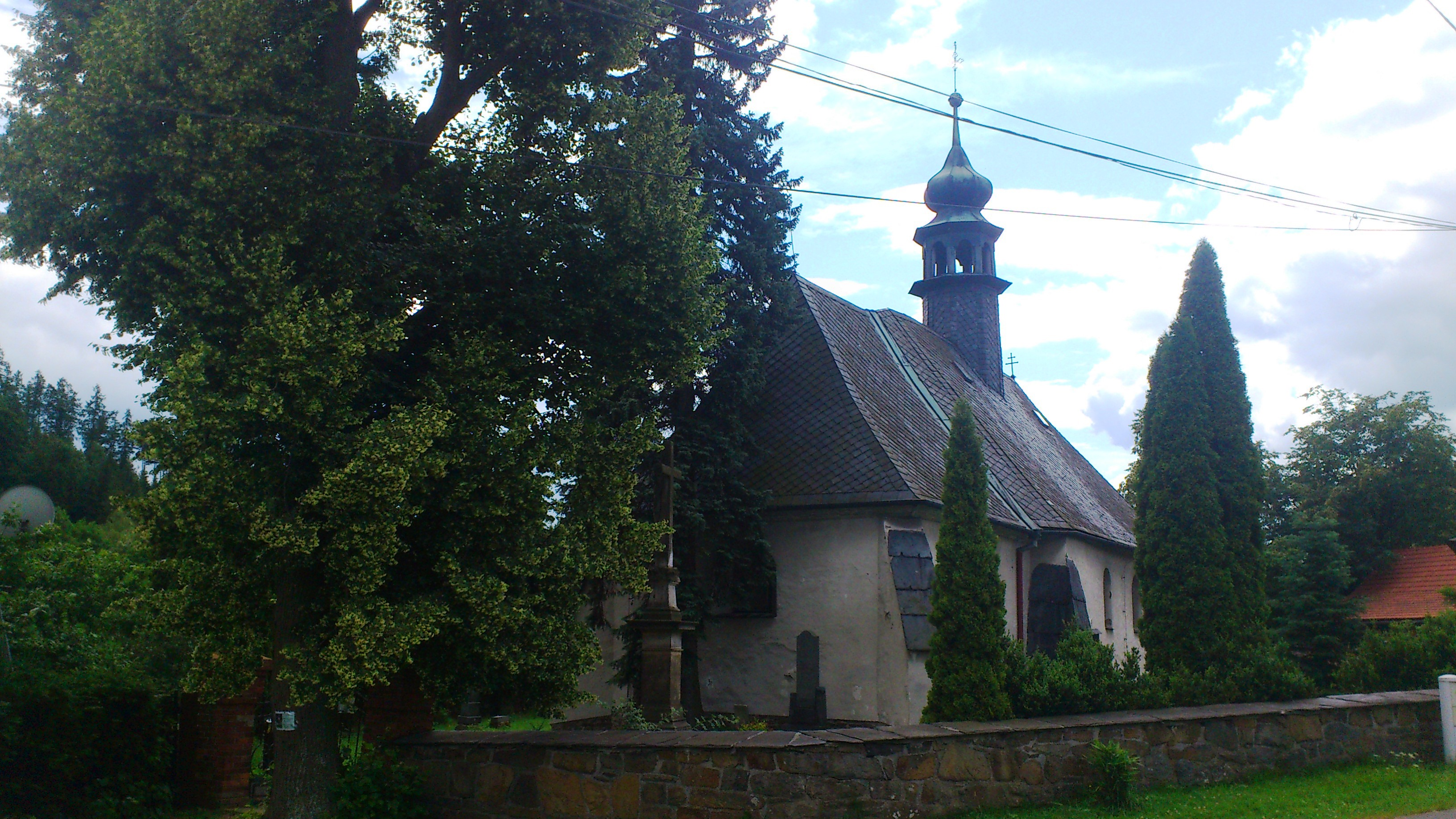
- Church of Saints Peter and Paul

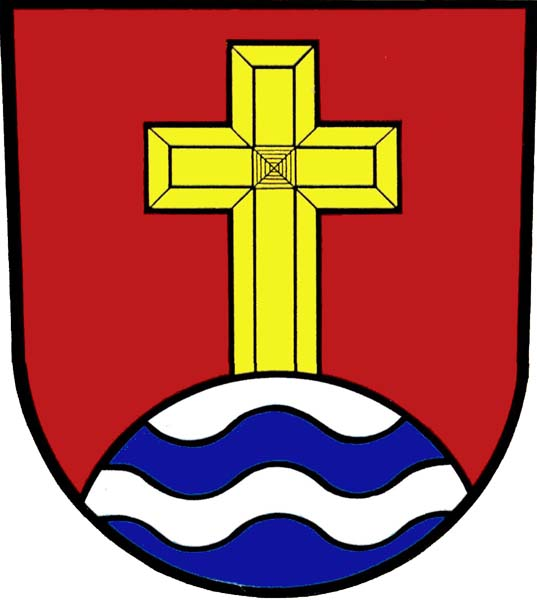
- Flag Coat of arms

- Location in the Czech Republic
- Coordinates: 49°49′54″N 17°41′0″E
- Country: Czech Republic
- Region: Moravian-Silesian
- District: Opava
- First mentioned: 1377

Area
  - Total: 8.31 km^{2} (3.21 sq mi)
- Elevation: 404 m (1,325 ft)

Population (2026-01-01)
  - Total: 243
  - Density: 29.2/km^{2} (75.7/sq mi)
- Time zone: UTC+1 (CET)
  - Summer (DST): UTC+2 (CEST)
- Postal code: 747 86
- Website: www.kruzberk.cz

Kružberk (German: Kreuzberg) is a municipality and village in Opava District in the Moravian-Silesian Region of the Czech Republic. It has about 200 inhabitants.

== Geography ==
Kružberk is located about 19 kilometres (12 mi) southwest of Opava and 37 km (23 mi) west of Ostrava. It lies in the Nízký Jeseník range. The highest point is at 565 m (1,854 ft) above sea level. The municipality is situated on the left bank of the Moravice River, which forms the municipal border. A small part of the nearby Kružberk Reservoir, which was named after the municipality, is located in its territory.

== History ==
The first written mention of Kružberk is from 1377 as Creuczenburg.

After World War II, Kružberk's German-speaking inhabitants were expelled and the municipality was resettled by Czechs.

== Demographics ==
Historical population

Year	Pop.	±%
1869	760	—
1880	781	+2.8%
1890	731	−6.4%
1900	686	−6.2%
1910	618	−9.9%

Year	Pop.	±%
1921	602	−2.6%
1930	647	+7.5%
1950	417	−35.5%
1961	339	−18.7%
1970	311	−8.3%

Year	Pop.	±%
1980	315	+1.3%
1991	277	−12.1%
2001	296	+6.9%
2011	266	−10.1%
2021	245	−7.9%

Source: Censuses

== Transport ==
There are no railways or major roads passing through the municipality.

== Sights ==
The Church of Saints Peter probably dates from the first half of the 14th century. It was modified into its current form in the 18th and 19th centuries.

The Church of Saint Florian was built in the Empire style in 1810–1811. It was built on the site of an old chapel from the mid-18th century.
