= Vladimír Stibořík =

Czech sport shooter (1927–2014)

Personal information
- Born: 28 July 1927 Valšov, Czechoslovakia
- Died: 12 December 2014 (aged 87)

Sport
- Sport: Sport shooting

Vladimír Stibořík (28 July 1927 – 12 December 2014) was a Czech sport shooter. He competed at the 1960 Summer Olympics and the 1964 Summer Olympics.
