= Malá Morávka =

- Municipality
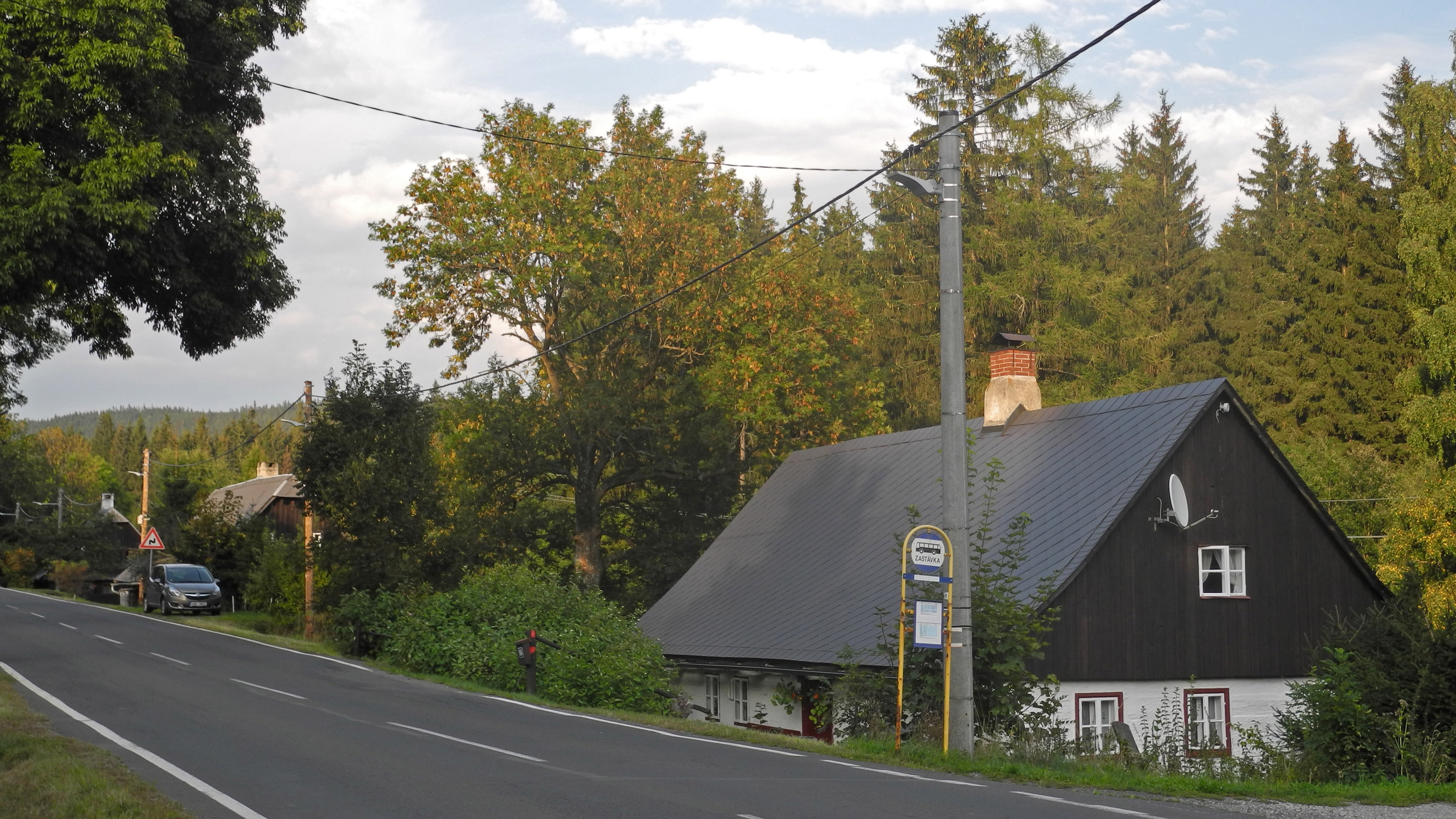
- Karlov pod Pradědem, a part of Malá Morávka

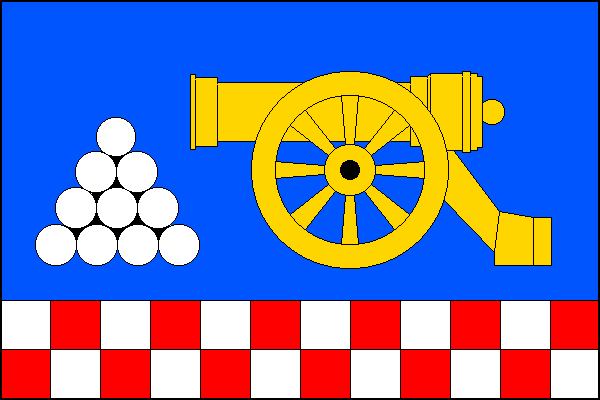
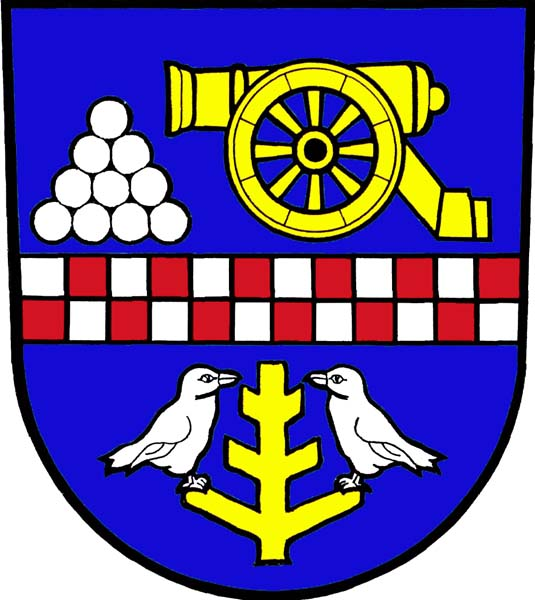
- Flag Coat of arms

- Location in the Czech Republic
- Coordinates: 50°1′16″N 17°18′43″E
- Country: Czech Republic
- Region: Moravian-Silesian
- District: Bruntál
- First mentioned: 1598

Area
  - Total: 61.56 km^{2} (23.77 sq mi)
- Elevation: 660 m (2,170 ft)

Population (2026-01-01)
  - Total: 616
  - Density: 10.0/km^{2} (25.9/sq mi)
- Time zone: UTC+1 (CET)
  - Summer (DST): UTC+2 (CEST)
- Postal code: 793 36
- Website: www.malamoravka.cz

Malá Morávka (German: Klein Mohrau) is a municipality and village in Bruntál District in the Moravian-Silesian Region of the Czech Republic. It has about 600 inhabitants.

== Administrative division ==
Malá Morávka consists of two municipal parts (in brackets population according to the 2021 census):

- Malá Morávka (526)
- Karlov pod Pradědem (60)

== Geography ==
Malá Morávka is located about 11 kilometres (7 mi) west of Bruntál and 47 km (29 mi) north of Olomouc. It lies in the Hrubý Jeseník mountain range. The peaks of the three highest mountains of Hrubý Jeseník, including Praděd at 1,491 m (4,892 ft) above sea level, lie in the northwestern part of the municipal territory. The Moravice River and the stream Bělokamenný potok flows though the territory and join in the village.

== History ==
From the 15th century, the area was owned by Lords of Vrbno and was known for mining of iron ore. A group of hammer mills was founded in the area of Malá Morávka in the second half of the 16th century. The first written mention of Malá Morávka is from 1598.

== Demographics ==
Historical population

Year	Pop.	±%
1869	2,106	—
1880	2,383	+13.2%
1890	2,317	−2.8%
1900	2,000	−13.7%
1910	2,064	+3.2%

Year	Pop.	±%
1921	1,796	−13.0%
1930	1,684	−6.2%
1950	1,027	−39.0%
1961	900	−12.4%
1970	783	−13.0%

Year	Pop.	±%
1980	816	+4.2%
1991	717	−12.1%
2001	754	+5.2%
2011	700	−7.2%
2021	586	−16.3%

Source: Censuses

== Transport ==
Malá Morávka is the start and terminus of a short railway line from/to Bruntál. It operates only in the summer season.

== Sights ==
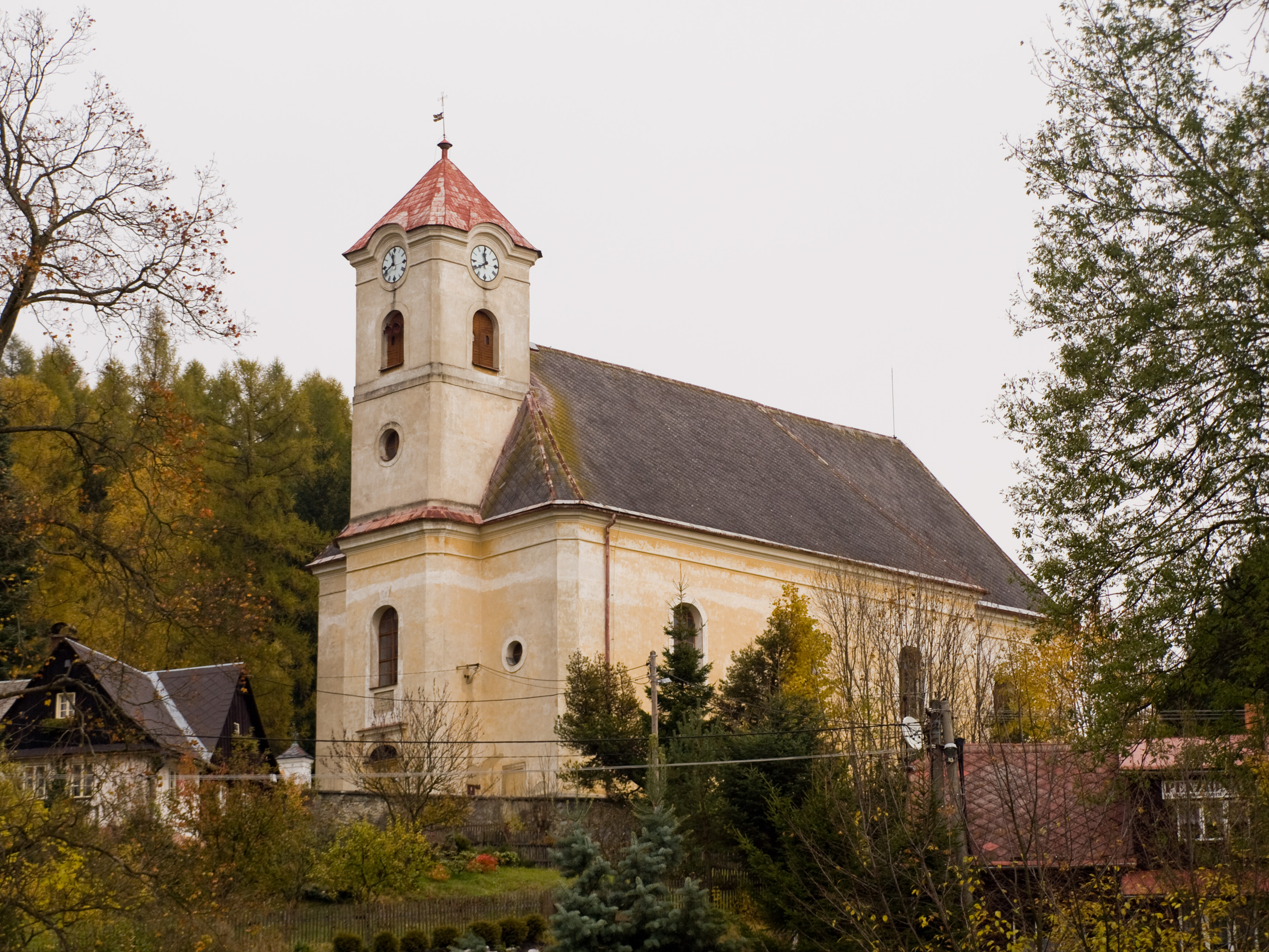
Church of All Saints

The main landmark of Malá Morávka is the Church of All Saints. It was built in the Neoclassical style in 1790–1793.

Malá Morávka is protected as a village monument zone for the well-preserved urbanism of a village typical of this region and for many high-quality examples of regional folk architecture.
