= Hradec nad Moravicí =

- Town
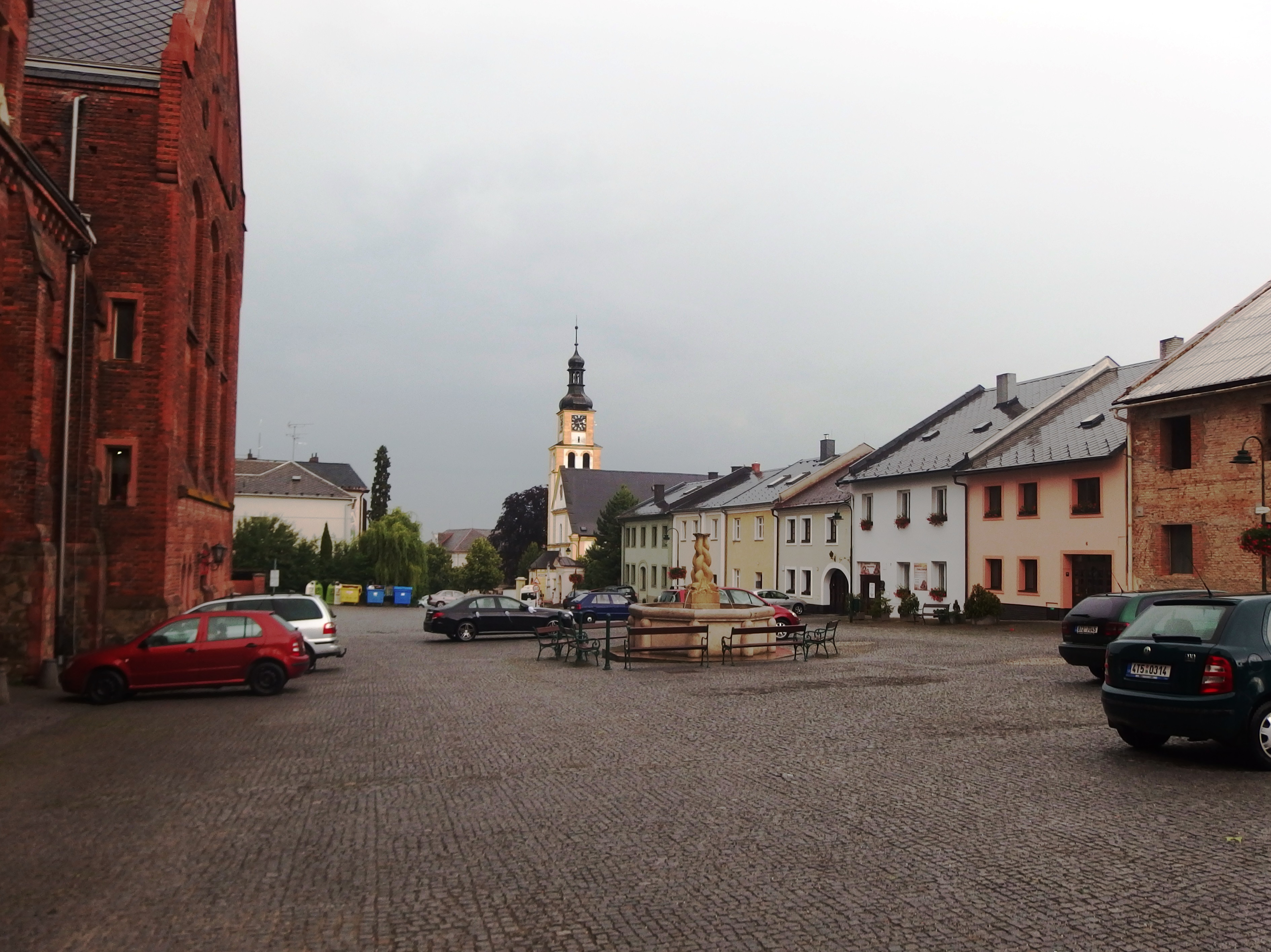
- Town square

- Flag Coat of arms

- Location in the Czech Republic
- Coordinates: 49°52′16″N 17°52′33″E
- Country: Czech Republic
- Region: Moravian-Silesian
- District: Opava
- First mentioned: 1066

Government
  - Mayor: Patrik Orlík

Area
  - Total: 43.96 km^{2} (16.97 sq mi)
- Elevation: 264 m (866 ft)

Population (2026-01-01)
  - Total: 5,444
  - Density: 123.8/km^{2} (320.7/sq mi)
- Time zone: UTC+1 (CET)
  - Summer (DST): UTC+2 (CEST)
- Postal codes: 747 41, 747 84
- Website: www.muhradec.cz

Hradec nad Moravicí (Czech pronunciation: [ˈɦradɛts ˈnad moravɪtsiː]; German: Grätz) is a town in Opava District in the Moravian-Silesian Region of the Czech Republic. It has about 5,400 inhabitants. The town is located on the Moravice River in the Nízký Jeseník range.

The most important monument in Hradec nad Moravicí is the Hradec nad Moravicí Castle, which is protected as a national cultural monument. The historic town centre with the castle complex is well preserved and is protected as an urban monument zone.

== Administrative division ==
Hradec nad Moravicí consists of eight municipal parts (in brackets population according to the 2021 census):

- Hradec nad Moravicí (2,808)
- Benkovice (239)
- Bohučovice (333)
- Domoradovice (246)
- Filipovice (77)
- Jakubčovice (491)
- Kajlovec (323)
- Žimrovice (767)

== Etymology ==
The name Hradec is a diminutive of the Czech word hrad ('castle'). The suffix nad Moravicí means 'upon the Moravice'.

== Geography ==
Hradec nad Moravicí is located about 7 kilometres (4 mi) south of Opava and 23 km (14 mi) west of Ostrava. It lies in the Nízký Jeseník range. The highest point is the hill Šance at 522 m (1,713 ft) above sea level. The Moravice River flows through the town.

== History ==
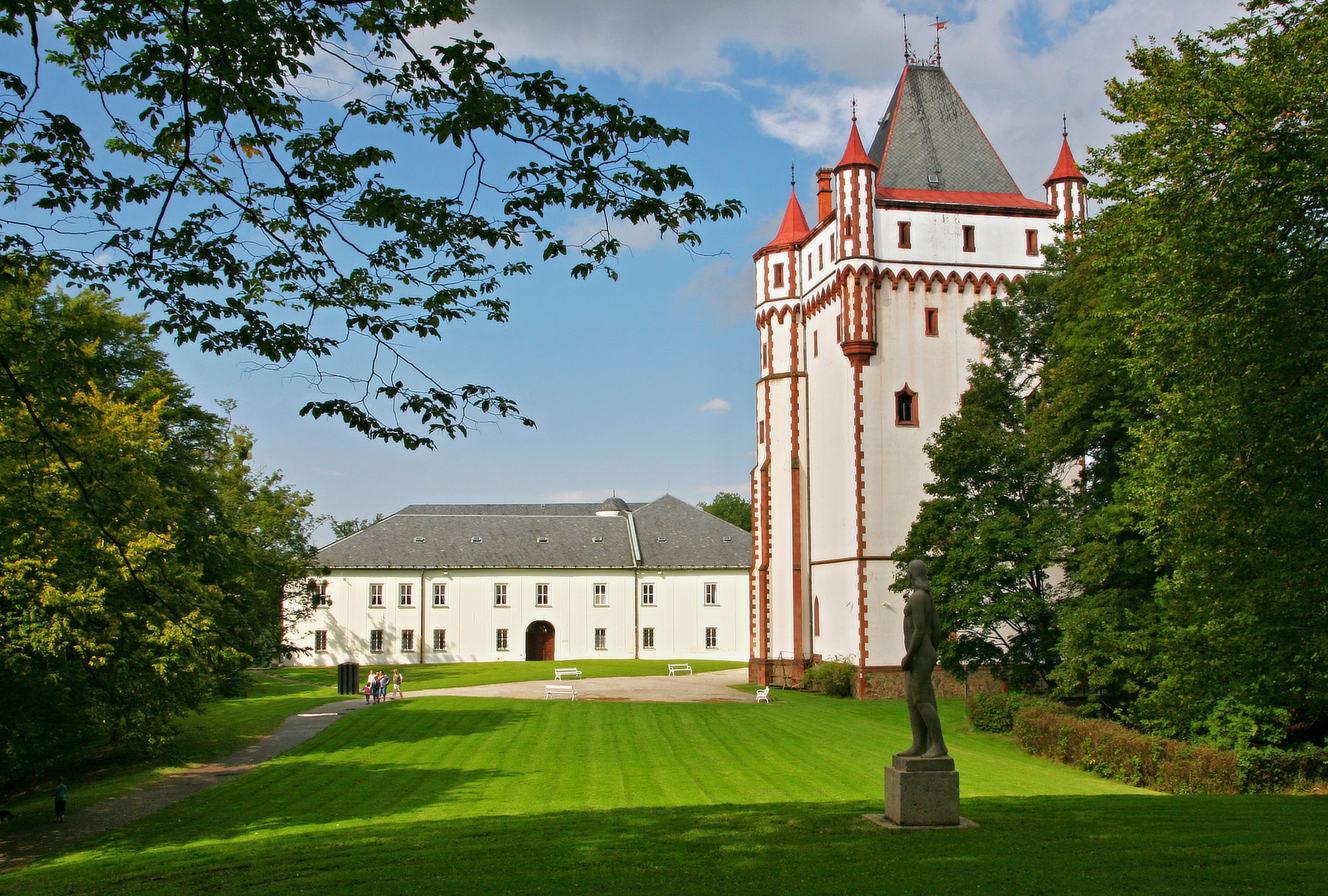
White Castle and White Tower

The area around Hradec nad Moravicí was first settled approximately in 3000 BC. A gord was built in the 8th century. The first written mention of Hradec and the local fortress is from 1060, when Bolesław II the Generous' army was defeated here.

After the fortress was damaged by fire in the mid-13th century, King Ottokar II of Bohemia had rebuilt it into an extensive Gothic castle. The castle gained importance in the years 1279–1281, when the widowed Queen Kunigunde lived here, and subsequently when it became the seat castle of the Duchy of Troppau. In 1481, the settlement was promoted to a town. In the Middle Ages, the town with the castle was never conquered.

Hradec was owned by the Czech kings until 1585, when Rudolf II sold it to Kašpar Pruskovský of Pruskov. The town suffered during the Thirty Years' War and lost its town rights until 1702. In 1778, the Hradec estate was purchased by the princely house of Lichnowsky, who owned it until 1945.

The town experienced significant industrial growth in 19th century and a railway was connected to the town in 1905. From 1938 to 1945, the town was annexed by Nazi Germany and administered as part of the Reichsgau Sudetenland. It was returned to Czechoslovakia in 1945, and the town's German population was expelled. Between 1968 and 1972, several municipalities were annexed to Hradec. In 1972, the town was renamed Hradec nad Moravicí.

== Demographics ==
Historical population

Year	Pop.	±%
1869	3,944	—
1880	4,028	+2.1%
1890	3,995	−0.8%
1900	4,071	+1.9%
1910	4,585	+12.6%

Year	Pop.	±%
1921	5,062	+10.4%
1930	4,916	−2.9%
1950	4,348	−11.6%
1961	4,900	+12.7%
1970	4,700	−4.1%

Year	Pop.	±%
1980	4,903	+4.3%
1991	4,973	+1.4%
2001	5,033	+1.2%
2011	5,382	+6.9%
2021	5,284	−1.8%

Source: Censuses

== Transport ==
The I/57 road from Opava to Nový Jičín runs through the town.

Hradec nad Moravicí is connected with Opava by a short railway line of local importance.

== Culture ==
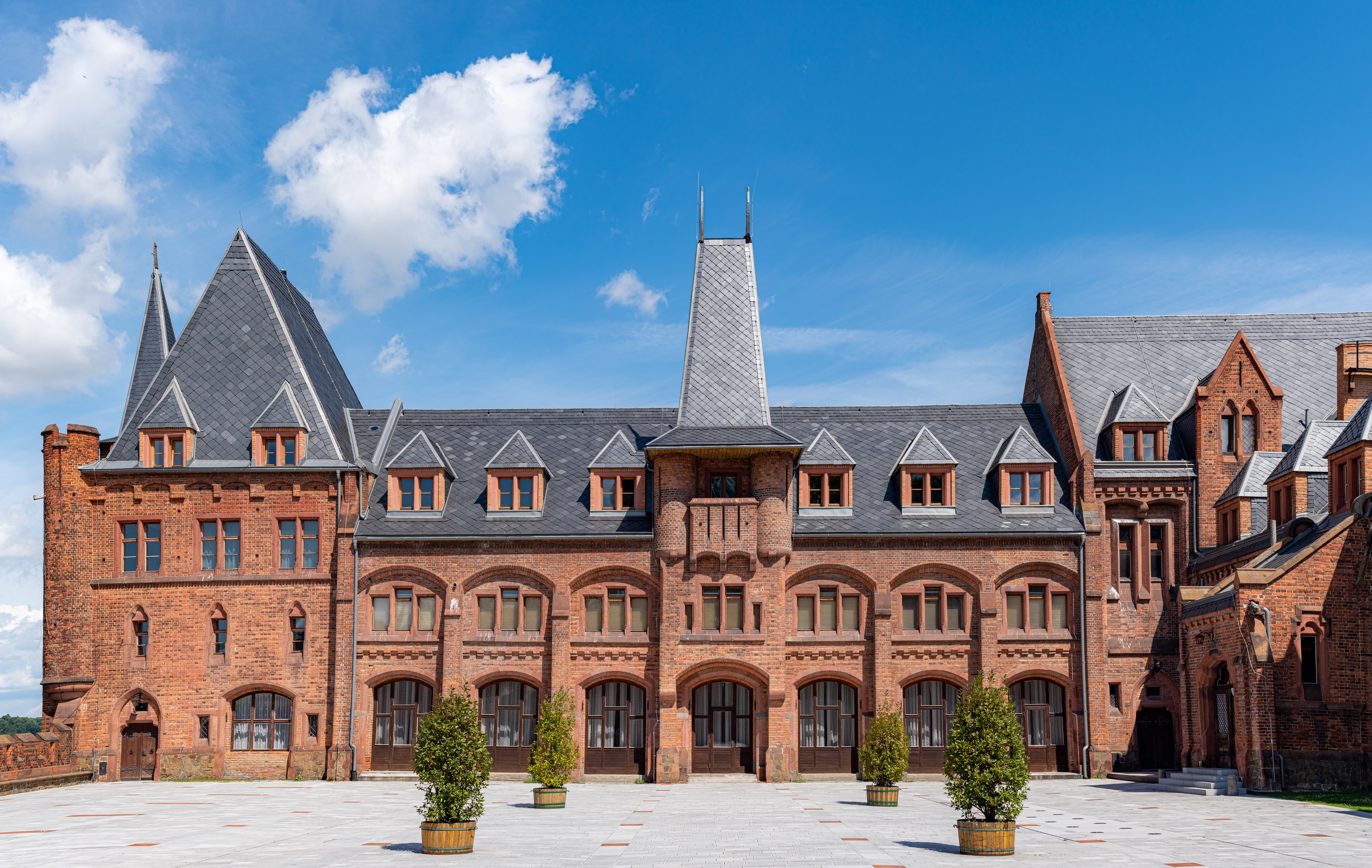
Red Castle

Beethoven's Hradec is an annual cultural event held in Hradec na Moravicí, described as international music competition and music festival. It commemorates two stays of Ludwig van Beethoven at the castle and has been held regularly since 1960.

== Sights ==
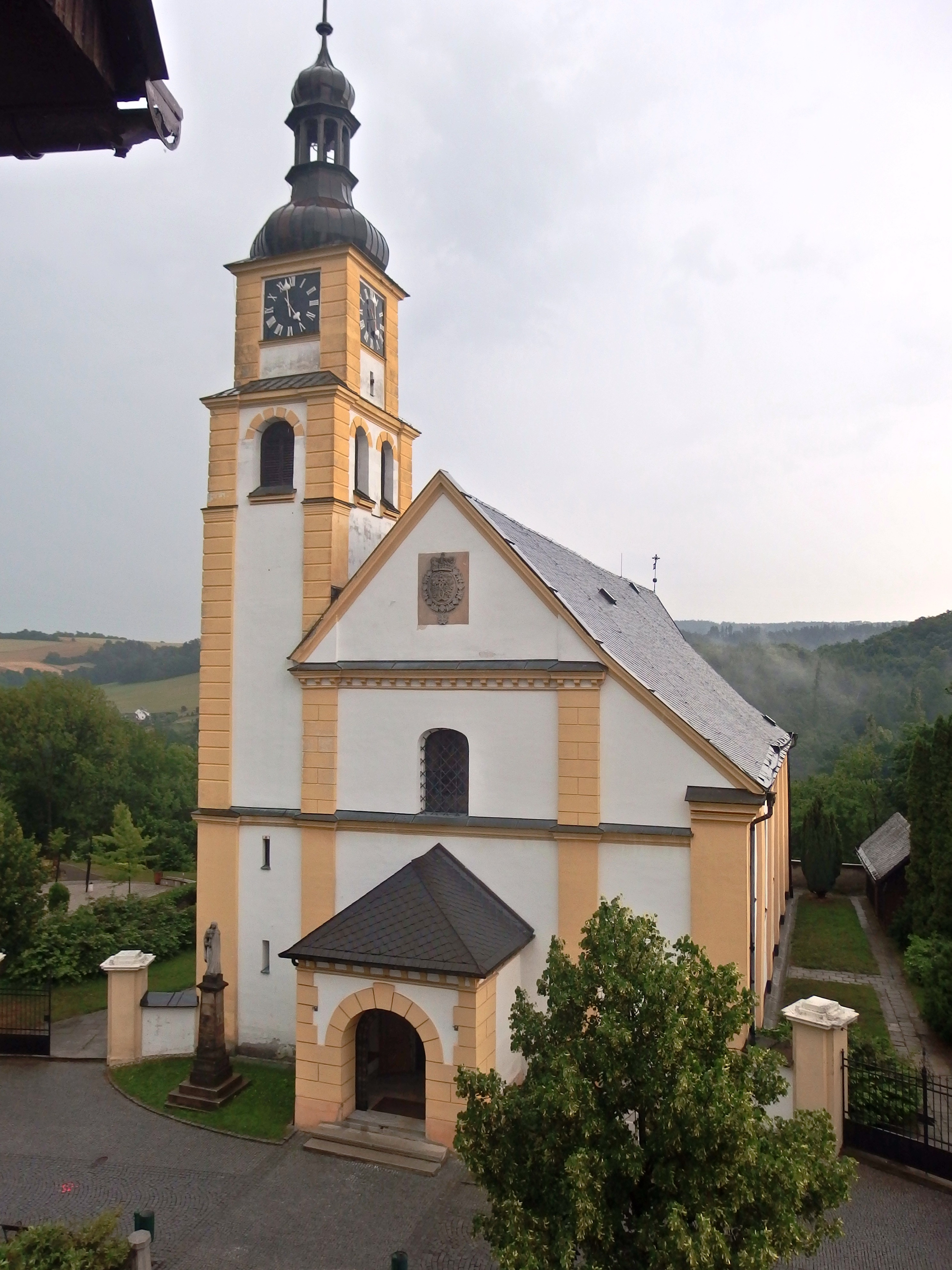
Church of Saints Peter and Paul

Hradec nad Moravicí is known for the Hradec nad Moravicí Castle. It is a complex formed by the older building, known as White Castle, newer building known as Red Castle, and a large castle park. The original Gothic castle was rebuilt into a Renaissance residence by the Pruskovský of Pruskov family after 1585. The castle was damaged by the 1796 fire. It was reconstructed in the Empire style in 1796–1804, and the English-style park was founded. The White Castle has retained its Empire appearance to this day. In the second half of the 19th century, the complex was extended by the neo-Gothic Red Castle with stables, coach rooms and mural wall. The last structure built in the castle complex was the pseudo-Gothic White Tower.

Today the castle is owned by the state and is open to the public. It contains several expositions with valuable collections, and a gallery. The castle park with an area of 130 ha (320 acres) is the third largest castle park in the Czech Republic. It includes a valuable collection of exotic trees and shrubs. The entire castle complex is protected as a national cultural monument.

The Church of Saints Peter and Paul was built between 1585 and 1594. It has the oldest bells in the region. Silesian Calvary is a pilgrimage site formed by Stations of the Cross from 1764, leading from the town to Kalvárie Hill.

Šance are the remains of 18th-century military fortifications that were built during the Silesian Wars near Jakubčovice. It is the highest point of the town. An observation tower was built here in 2005.

== Notable people ==
- Felix Lichnowsky (1814–1848), nobleman and politician; lived here

== Twin towns – sister cities ==
Hradec nad Moravicí is twinned with:

- Baborów, Poland
- Liptovský Hrádok, Slovakia
