= Valšov =

- Municipality
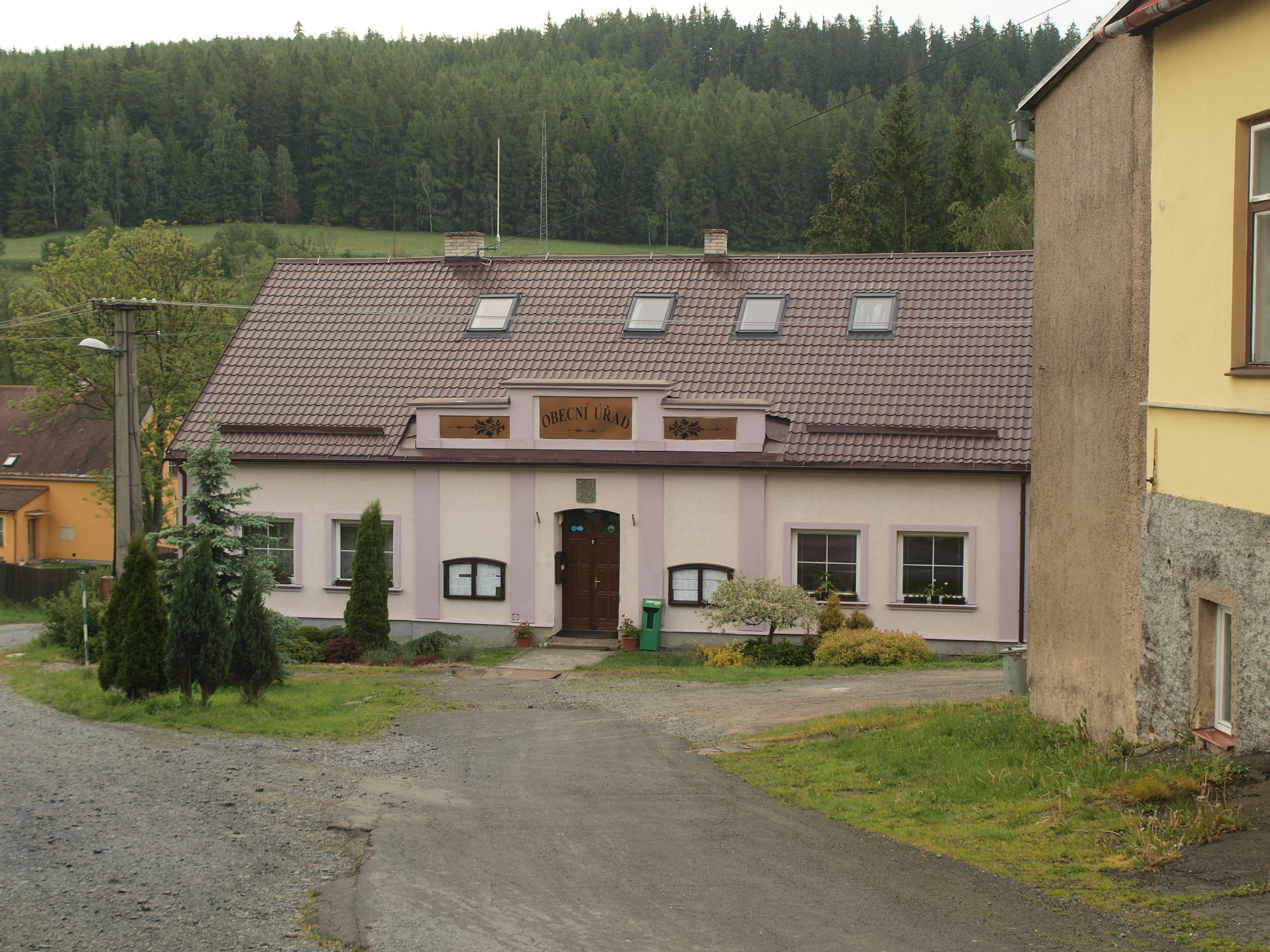
- Municipal office

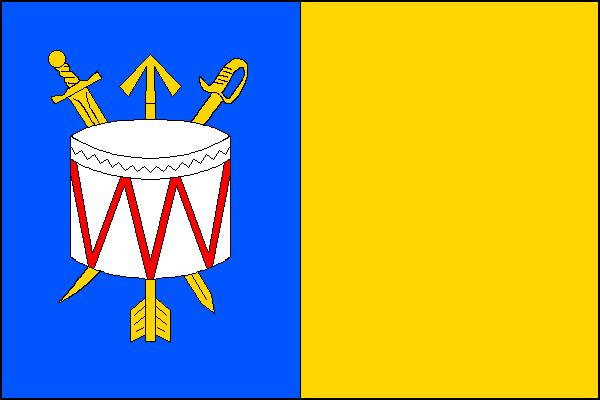
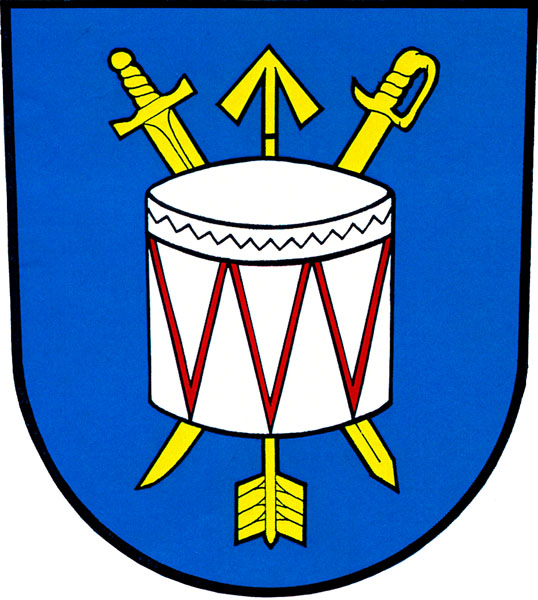
- Flag Coat of arms

- Location in the Czech Republic
- Coordinates: 49°56′0″N 17°26′17″E
- Country: Czech Republic
- Region: Moravian-Silesian
- District: Bruntál
- First mentioned: 1377

Area
  - Total: 9.82 km^{2} (3.79 sq mi)
- Elevation: 520 m (1,710 ft)

Population (2026-01-01)
  - Total: 255
  - Density: 26.0/km^{2} (67.3/sq mi)
- Time zone: UTC+1 (CET)
  - Summer (DST): UTC+2 (CEST)
- Postal code: 792 01
- Website: www.obecvalsov.cz

Valšov (formerly Vojnovice; German: Kriegsdorf) is a municipality and village in Bruntál District in the Moravian-Silesian Region of the Czech Republic. It has about 300 inhabitants.

== Demographics ==
Historical population
Year	Pop.	±%
1869	470	—
1880	523	+11.3%
1890	588	+12.4%
1900	534	−9.2%
1910	567	+6.2%
1921	537	−5.3%
1930	583	+8.6%
1950	354	−39.3%
1961	330	−6.8%
1970	301	−8.8%
1980	274	−9.0%
1991	224	−18.2%
2001	263	+17.4%
2011	251	−4.6%
2021	235	−6.4%
Source: Censuses

== Transport ==
Valšov is located on the Valšov–Rýmařov railway.

== Notable people ==
- Vladimír Stibořík (1927–2014), sport shooter
