= Bistricioara (Tismana) =

- Location within Romania

Location
- Country: Romania
- Counties: Gorj County
- Villages: Boroșteni

Physical characteristics
- Source: Vâlcan Mountains
- Mouth: Bistrița
  - coordinates: 45.0796°N 23.0489°E
- Length: 13 km (8.1 mi)
- Basin size: 21 km^{2} (8.1 sq mi)

Basin features
- Progression: Bistrița→ Tismana→ Jiu→ Danube→ Black Sea

The Bistricioara is a right tributary of the river Bistrița in Romania. It flows into the Bistrița in Peștișani. Its length is 13 km (8.1 mi) and its basin size is 21 km^{2} (8.1 sq mi).
