= Bâlta (river) =

River in Romania

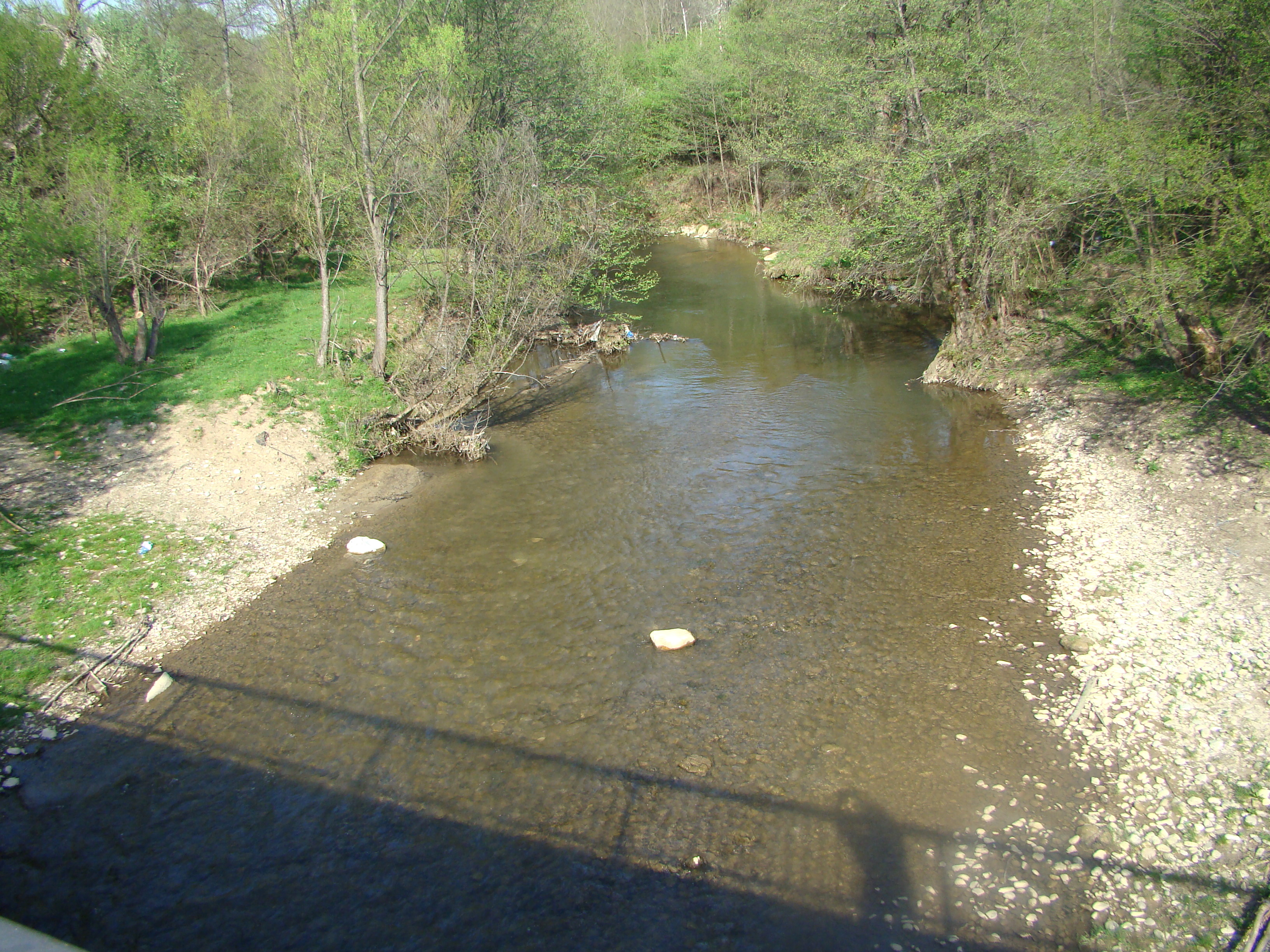

- Location within Romania

Location
- Country: Romania
- Counties: Gorj County
- Villages: Bâlta, Brădiceni

Physical characteristics
- Source
  - location: Vâlcan Mountains
- Mouth: Bistrița
  - coordinates: 45.0283°N 23.0801°E
- Length: 19 km (12 mi)
- Basin size: 78 km^{2} (30 sq mi)

Basin features
- Progression: Bistrița→ Tismana→ Jiu→ Danube→ Black Sea
- Tributaries
  - left: Bătrâna
- River code: VII.1.31.6b.5

The Bâlta is a left tributary of the river Bistrița in Romania. It flows into the Bistrița near Telești. Its length is 19 km (12 mi) and its basin size is 78 km^{2} (30 sq mi).

== Tributaries ==
The following rivers are tributaries to the river Bâlta (from source to mouth):

- Left: Toplicioara cu Apă, Pârâul Mare, Vranița, Bătrâna
- Right: Zăpodia, Dobârcina, Viteazu, Padeș
