= Ilie Purcaru =

Romanian journalist and poet (1933–2008)

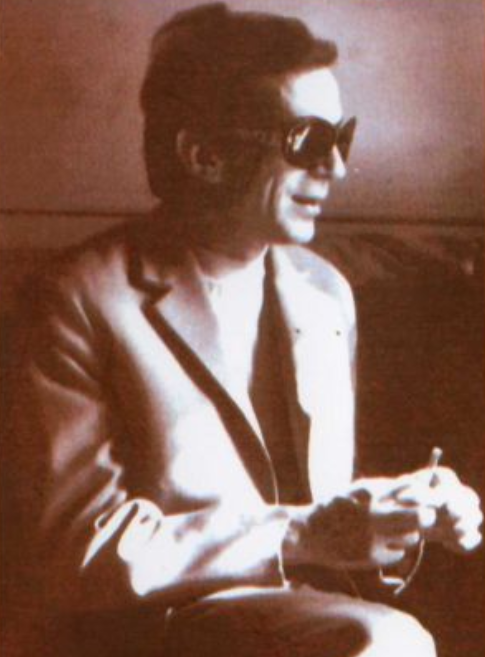
- Purcaru c. 1980
- Born: 5 November 1933; Râmnicu Vâlcea, Kingdom of Romania
- Died: 10 October 2008 (aged 74); Bucharest, Romania
- Occupation: Journalist
- Writing career
- Period: c. 1949–2008
- Genres: Reportage; lyric poetry; political poetry; free verse; prose poem; young adult literature; travel literature; memoir; biography
- Literary movement: Socialist realism; Neoconstructivism; Protochronism

Ilie Purcaru (5 November 1933 – 10 October 2008) was a Romanian journalist and poet, much of whose writing was in support of the communist regime. A native of the Oltenia region, he had an early debut in the Romanian Communist Party press, and was hailed as a child prodigy in the realm of poetry; trained as a conventional Socialist realist, by the late 1950s he was trying to promote Neoconstructivism, but found himself repressed by communist censorship. Purcaru was recovered for his propaganda-writing, then helped re-establish the Craiova-based magazine Ramuri, which he directed until 1969. Partnering up with Miron Radu Paraschivescu, he provoked censors by publishing Onirist poets, as well as by cultivating former fascists. He was nevertheless largely compatible with the regime's national-communist turn; as a pioneer of the reportage genre, he expanded on influences from Geo Bogza and Tudor Arghezi to create a new, distinctly poetic, language of propaganda. In tandem, Purcaru visited Southeast Asia as a press correspondent, being a personal witness to the Vietnamese and Laotian Wars.

Though widely seen as a gifted writer even in the realm of propaganda, Purcaru elicited an enduring controversy by veering into the extremes of national-communism, which came with his embracing the views and the linguistic violence of Protochronism. While he remained a relative moderate in this camp, and published an interview with the anti-Protochronist Nicolae Manolescu, he was still treasured by the regime, and as such served in official capacities until the Romanian Revolution of 1989. Embroiled in a corruption scandal, and barred from working in the press, he was defended by Adrian Păunescu, and employed by him at Flacăra. Especially in that context, Purcaru began exploring the life of peasants, described by him as icons of honesty; he also added to the controversy surrounding his life by making repeated contributions to Nicolae Ceaușescu's cult of personality.

This standing in national-communist literature came alongside a belated return to poetry, with verse that was praised for its tender, bookish, humorous touches. Purcaru remained active after the Revolution, especially as the editor of short-lived publications, one of which was in support of the Democratic Laborists, and another put out by the Romanian Hearth Union. He also served for a while as editorial secretary at Dimineața, of the governing Democratic National Salvation Front. Purcaru was ready to accept the regime change, but found himself shunned by the literary mainstream. In old age, he also joined a new publishing venture launched by Păunescu in opposition to Flacăra. Before his death, Purcaru was reediting his earlier works, issuing the complete notebooks of his journeys in North Vietnam and the Kingdom of Laos.

== Early life ==
Purcaru was born in the Oltenian city of Râmnicu Vâlcea, then part of the Kingdom of Romania, as the son of Ioan Purcaru and his wife Aurora (née Năchescu), both of whom were schoolteachers; the couple also had a daughter, Georgeta. The family's roots were in other parts of Oltenia: Aurora was a native of Târgu Cărbunești, and Ioan came in from Craiova, but was originally from Gura Motrului. The writer was always proud of his regional affiliation, confessing in 1972 that he shared the Oltenians' "egocentric" mindset, and was only truly moved by news from this area, having an "Oltenian ear". His colleague Artur Silvestri once portrayed him as the "physical embodiment of the Oltenian writer": "short, slender, energetic with his irritability, his gesturing impetuous, interrogative".

The family had preserved the full collection of Arhivele Olteniei journal, put out by the local historian C. D. Fortunescu, whom Ilie got to meet as a child. Ioan encouraged his son to write, and, later in life, kept count of all his articles. The Purcarus moved to Craiova when Ilie was aged seven, renting one of the suburban homes owned by the local industrialist Roth, who also ran Nazi Germany's local consulate. Young Purcaru attended primary school during World War II (from 1940 to 1944) and, from 1944 to 1950, Frații Buzești High School. During his time at the latter institution, he attended a literary circle founded by his teachers Luca Preda and Fanu Duțulescu. In a 1984 interview, he referred to his direct experience of the anti-Nazi coup of August 1944, during which his family bunked with Roth's wife, who had a look of "primal fear"; her husband and son had disappeared, never to return. Purcaru spoke of himself and fellow writer Paul Anghel as participants in "our revolution", which had taken place after the coup. Specifically, they had planted posters with slogans favoring the Communist Party, before joining the Union of Communist Youth (UTC) in late 1947.

Purcaru made his debut during the early stages of the communist regime (originally called "Romanian People's Republic"), though literary historian Dumitru Micu provides two different dates and contexts: either in 1949, with prose published in Craiova's Caiet Literar, or the following year, with poems taken up by the central magazine Contemporanul (Purcaru himself favored the latter account). From 1950 to 1951, he studied at the Mihai Eminescu Literature School in Bucharest, being possibly its youngest-ever student. In May 1951, one of his contributions to young adult literature were awarded a prize by the specialized publishing house, Editura Tineretului. One anonymous report filed with the UTC had was also one of several inductees who had decided to drop out of high school, since "now that they're writers, they [believe that they] no longer need the high school". One of his colleagues was the future novelist Aurel Rău, who recalls that Purcaru was regarded as holding "great promise".

During the later stages of communism, the Eminescu School's activity came to be seen as "highly controversial". In a 1985 interview with Mihai Ungheanu, Purcaru acknowledged this as a fact, but added: "this school has also produced some writers. People who have rescued and then imposed themselves with their own talent, but also through the help provided by this school." One of Purcaru's older schoolmates, Alexandru Andrițoiu, declared that Purcaru himself was already an "exemplary" poet, whose verse stood out from the rest in "that barren dogmatic era". His period there was nevertheless extended by his induction into the official literary current of Socialist realism (also known as the Romanian "Proletkult"); the official press sampled his poetic work, as "vibrant with the love for the country that is being built":

Mi-s prieteni ape
Ce sclipesc sub pleoape
Cînd se-ncheagă zorile
Și se deschid florile.
Mi-e prieten șoimul,
Dar mai drag mi-e omul,
Omul viitorului,
Zorului și sporului.

Translation:

I love glistening rivers
And their many shivers
When flowers awaken
To the dawn that's breaking.
What I like much more,
More than hawks that soar,
Are men, like you and me,
Their work, their industry.

== Scînteia and Anul XV ==
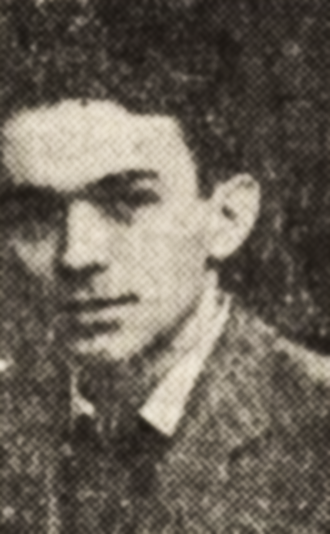
Purcaru in the 1950s

Though still an adolescent, Purcaru was made an editor at the Communist Party's daily, Scînteia, staying there from 1951 to 1957. As noted by literary historian Ana Selejan, he was one of that publication's "top reporters", and one of the few to have taken up the reportage genre without first going through a fiction-writing stage. She lists Purcaru among other examples of men and women who entered literature by way of Scînteia, including Maria Banuș, Dan Deșliu, Petru Dumitriu, and Victor Bârlădeanu. Their contribution, she adds, were rarely commented on by the regime's literary press, and was mainly regarded as a subset of agitprop, with a "mobilizing, educational effect", only differing in that they required actual travels out in the field. Purcaru himself contributed such texts upon visiting Doicești (1951) and the building site of Bicaz Power Station (1953). His direct superior at Scînteia was Sorin Toma, with whom he did not get along. In old age, Purcaru recalled that, on his first day, Toma asked him to extend his hand and, upon noticing that it was trembling, asked him: "What is it that you're not disclosing to the [communist] party?" Toma, who survived Purcaru, dismissed the account as inaccurate, and advanced instead the claim that Purcaru, like many others of his employees, was a high-functioning alcoholic; if he was checking Purcaru's hands, it was in a search for signs of intoxication.

Purcaru complained in 1984 that he and Anghel were rarely allowed to publish their literary work, which had already branched out of the reportage genre—and that even their contributions as reporters were rarely tolerated by communist censors. Toma provides a contrasting account, suggesting that Purcaru, as a "very handsome" young man, was well-liked by the communist leader, Gheorghe Gheorghiu-Dej. In order not to disappoint the latter by revealing that Purcaru did not meet ethical standards, Scînteia made efforts to conceal his drinking habits. Purcaru traveled into the Soviet Union, alongside Valeriu Negru, as press envoys to the 6th World Festival of Youth and Students in August 1957. As one of his last assignments at Scînteia, Purcaru covered the Vnukovo International Airport incident which had resulted in the death of a Romanian communist official, Grigore Preoteasa. In late 1958, a special issue of Viața Romînească, showcasing the society and culture of Northern Dobruja, featured his piece on the agronomist Năstăsoiu, who had chosen to live permanently on a collective farm. This text was praised in Tribuna magazine for displaying Purcaru's skill as a humorist.

Around that time, Purcaru and his lifelong friend Anghel co-wrote a poem, subsequently taken up by George Ivașcu in Contemporanul. Called Anul XV, and commemorating the events of 1944, it generated some controversy for using free verse and relying on Constructivist imagery. Purcaru later reported that they had consciously challenged "traditionalist" taboos, merging the atmosphere of communist rallies with poetic techniques borrowed from Vladimir Mayakovsky, Demyan Bedny, Ion Barbu, and the unu group of avant-garde poets. Ion Oarcăsu of Tribuna disliked its "violent abstractization", but defended its "accomplished portions" and "Mayakovskyian inspiration". An anonymous source reported to the Securitate and the censors that the piece was "surrealistic", which resulted in both authors being barred from publishing for a couple of years. The claim was upheld publicly by critic Gabriel Dimisianu in April 1961, when the argued that the two authors had betrayed the guidelines of Socialist realism by toying with "futurist techniques"; Dimisianu however noted that the neo-traditionalist content promoted by other authors was equally wrong.

Anghel was further repressed because of his marriage to the film director Malvina Urșianu, who was suspected by the authorities of being an anticommunist opinion-maker, and detained as such in 1958. Ultimately released later that year, Urșianu credited Purcaru as one of the people who spoke out in her support. In 1960–1961, Purcaru had an editorial position at Contemporanul, now working directly under Ivașcu. His colleagues there included Felicia Antip, who recalled that Ivașcu "never forced authors he respected to write any sort of mendacious, agitprop text [...]. That area was zealously covered by a clique of editors and contributors, comprising Vasile Băran [and] Ilie Purcaru". During summer 1961, Purcaru was assigned to do his documentary research in Iași Region. He later moved offices to Luceafărul, where he worked from 1962 to 1964. During this time, he traveled the Wallachian Plain to document the harvest; his contribution was included in the 1963 book Moment istoric, wherein various writers offered praise to the collectivization of agriculture. It was also then that he began his work as an interviewer, centering it on senior literary figures. In a 1983 piece, literary critic Alexandru Oprea described this contribution as commendable, "in the tradition of a genre constructed by Felix Aderca and Ion Biberi". Also then, journalist Nicolae Georgescu assessed that a 1962 interview with George Călinescu, taken by Purcaru and Ștefan Bănulescu, was still a Luceafărul milestone.

== Ramuri and Vietnam ==
Described by Micu as a born reporter, Purcaru was interested in the most varied contemporary issues. Micu also notes that Purcaru's early years were marked by a predominance of romantic, exalted tones, producing several works: Zile fierbinți (1955, with V. Negru), Calitatea producției — onoarea fabricii (1956), Ev nou în Țara Banilor (1961), Harpe și ape. Album dunărean (1962). The latter book, comprising accounts of his travels along the Danube, was written on a dare, in a successful attempt out outdoing another reporter, Mihai Stoian. Most of these works expand on the notion of ev nou ("new era") as a descriptor for Romania's communization. Some cover more than one volume, presenting as a form of "monographic reportage". As noted by Micu, Ev nou în Țara Banilor transcends the "conventionality and opportunism" of regular communist writings by embracing subtlety and expanding the means of expression—from historical and sociological essay to prose poem; he detects in it echoes from Tudor Arghezi's modern hymns and from Geo Bogza's classic reportage pieces, but also foreshadows of the 1980s propaganda festival, Cîntarea României. Literary critic Alex. Ștefănescu regards Purcaru and Traian T. Coșovei as "Bogza's epigones". They had only borrowed Bogza's "poetic-bombastic style" while ignoring his other trait, namely a "remarkable concreteness". Purcaru himself specialized in geographic similes, comparing Oltenia to a bow and (in Harpe și ape) the whole of Romania to a harp, with rivers as the strings. Micu defends such metaphors as still charming, but acknowledges that Purcaru doused them in a "heavily politicized discourse, reflecting the communist spirit", thus leaving his readers with a "feeling of disgust" (sentiment de lehamite).

Purcaru's journalistic contribution was still rewarded in 1964, when he was inducted into the Order of Labor (Ordinul Muncii), Third Class. His rise as a political writer straddled the communist rules of Gheorghiu-Dej and Nicolae Ceaușescu. His books acquired a more pronounced intellectual stance, beginning with the 1964 Colocvii. Artistul și opera sa, de la I. L. Caragiale la Eugen Barbu, where writers were his theme. As he later informed his readers, Colocvii could not feature his portraits of poets Miron Radu Paraschivescu and Ion Vinea, for "reasons that were outside my control, and theirs as well." In Escale spre noi înșine, which appeared at Editura Tineretului in 1966, Purcaru examined "the phenomenon of our [Romanian] presence abroad". It brought together the author's own reportage-writing, here distinctly modeled on the eclectic forms cultivated by Michel Butor, with Romanian-themed quotes from international figures (from Paul Morand and Miguel Ángel Asturias to Nâzım Hikmet), and with fragments from the international press.

While serving as chief editor of the Craiova newspaper Înainte, Purcaru was the founder and first editor of Ramuri magazine, appearing as a publication of Craiova Region's Committee for Culture and the Arts in 1964. He was also involved in campaigning for the People's Democratic Front ahead of legislative elections in March 1965, giving introductory speeches to its candidate, Ștefan Voitec. During that he period, he brought in at Ramuri other authors who favored the reportage genre—examples include Anghel, Adrian Păunescu, and Mihai Pelin. Here, Purcaru began testing the limits of communist liberalization—under his watch, Paraschivescu founded a supplement, Povestea Vorbei, which published dissenting authors of the Onirist group and other independents. He declared himself motivated by the Communist Party's 9th Congress, since it had ushered in "anti-Proletkult and anti-dogmatic literature", within a "climate of creative freedom". His stance was still seen as suspicious by the authorities. By 1967, the Securitate had planted an informant in Paraschivescu's summer home at Vălenii de Munte, observing him in conversations with his guests. These included writers Purcaru, Sidonia Drăgușanu, Dumitru Țepeneag and Alexandru Voitinovici, as well as the communist potentate Gogu Rădulescu.

In 1966–1967, Purcaru was an accredited press correspondent in the Vietnam War, described from the North Vietnamese side (which also provided him with bodyguards). In his memoirs, journalist Constantin Poenaru records legends about his departure. According to these, Purcaru had volunteered after being told that he was dying from cirrhosis. "By who knows what miracle", he only managed to cure his disease during his extended leave, and was subsequently "healthy as a horse" (sănătos tun). He and his wife lived in Hanoi for those two years, during which time a son was born to them. Purcaru's texts were first bound together as Focuri în junglă, which won him the annual prize of the UTC Central Committee for 1967. These writings are "filled with dramatic detail, and with tragedies hardly imaginable just two decades after humanity had known the horrors of World War II"; according to reviewer Laurențiu Ulici, they also showcase Purcaru as a man of "altruism and delicacy of sentiment." Some recount his direct experience of Operation Rolling Thunder, during which he hid out in caves. In one of his non-site articles for Scînteia, he described the massive effort at destroying a single "tiny bridge" in Yên Phong district.

While in Hanoi, Purcaru personally greeted writer Blaga Dimitrova, who came in from the People's Republic of Bulgaria. They became friends, and he was described by Dimitrova as "one of the most likeable characters to appear in my book", as well as a direct influence on her writing (by helping her "do away with tear-jerking lyricism"). While prevented by the Romanian Embassy from even setting foot in South Vietnam (he would only visit Ho Chi Minh City in the 1980s), he traveled from Hanoi to Vientiane to chronicle the Laotian Civil War. He managed to interview Souphanouvong, asking him to describe the governing platform of his Front for National Development. He was surprised to note that the "Red Prince", who had visited Romania in the 1930s, still remembered some Romanian words. According to his personal notebooks, he was still not trusted by Souphanouvong's Pathet Lao, which kept him under close surveillance. He recalled being put off by the regularity of American bombing in Laos, as it had affected an already destitute people. He himself had to take shelter with regular Laotians in the Viengxay Caves outside Xam Neua. The notebooks also detail his encounter with the isolated Miao people, whom he came to admire for their "purity of blood" and military prowess. Purcaru made a return trip to Craiova in mid-December 1966, when, as a member of the National Committee of Solidarity with the Vietnamese People's Struggle, he organized a workers' rally "against the acts of aggression performed by American imperialism in Vietnam."

== Protochronist turn ==
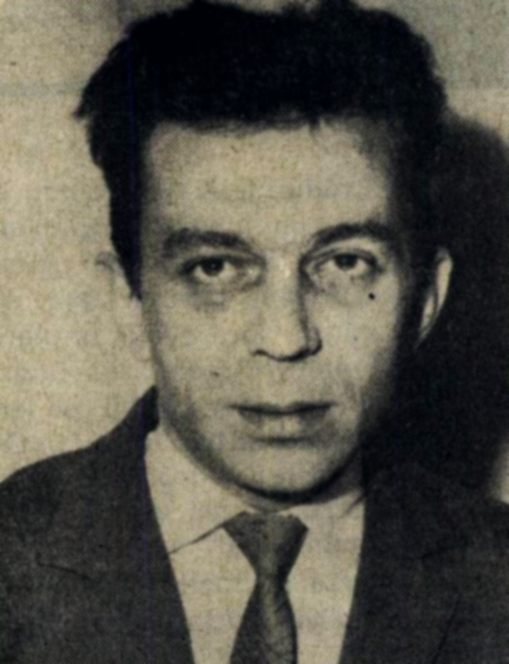
Purcaru in 1972

In June 1967, Purcaru was interviewed by the UTC's Scînteia Tineretului, to provide it with insight into his writing process. He expressed his admiration for Bogza, but noted that the latter's contributions of 1945 were also a "solemn funeral" of the genre—every other such work published since had been copying "a foreign model, arrived here from some place, the sort of place where there are no opinions, and no actual press, and no actual reportage". The censorship apparatus picked this out as a reference to Soviet propaganda, and the corresponding fragment was cut out of the interview. In April 1968, Purcaru also attended a meeting of the Craiova Communists, held in Voitec's presence. He declared himself in favor of raising the "ideological content of educational work", by having teachers trained in Marxism-Leninism; he also praised the Party for encouraging "authentic creativity", and also for its rehabilitation of Gheorghiu-Dej's victims, including "first and foremost" Lucrețiu Pătrășcanu. Around the same time, Ramuri was being kept under watch by Securitate agents, with one of their anonymous sources reporting that the editorial staff's "lack of vigilance and discernment" had led to the publication therein of a note praising Nae Ionescu, hitherto reviled as a pillar of the fascist Iron Guard. The Securitate document also claimed that the magazine had also nearly published works by political suspects, including former Guardists and a one-time member of the National Christian Party. In the Romanian diaspora, philosopher Mircea Eliade, who had been an Ionescu disciple, declared his surprise, adding a note of skepticism: he feared that "such 'excesses' might be used by the Stalinists (or whatever they're called) to turn the screws back on them."

As a journalist at Înainte, Purcaru was one of the reporters who were assigned to travel the country in Ceaușescu's motorcades. His contribution to that newspaper is believed to have remained timid in its approach to censorship. This was attested by the essayist and former political prisoner Ion Dezideriu Sîrbu, according to whom: "[Purcaru] would not publish me [there], knowing that I did not have the right to publish or the right of signature, as sympathetic as he was towards me, until he was granted permission to do so, and that's when they published my article about the icon-thieves in Brâncuși's village." The editor was still publicly anti-Soviet down to a fracas which occurred at a restaurant on Palace Square during late April 1969. Purcaru was drinking in the company of several journalists, including Vartan Arachelian, when they noticed that Soviet tourists were seated in their proximity; being annoyed by this and by their activity of the time, which was mainly focused on writing a "festive issue" for the International Workers' Day, they proceeded to sing forbidden and provocative songs (including Trăiască Regele, "Lili Marleen", and an Iron Guard hymn). The incident resulted in permanent surveillance by the Securitate for a one-year interval, as well as in a number of administrative sanctions. The instigators were dressed down by the Minister of Youth, Ion Iliescu, who chided the teetotaler Arachelian for having allowed Purcaru to sing, instead of "slapping him once or twice".

In mid-1969, Purcaru was replaced at Ramuri with the academic Alexandru Piru, who steered that magazine away from reportage-writing, promoting instead literary theory and history. Around 1970, Purcaru made visits to the island of Ada Kaleh, which was soon after submerged into the Danube upon the construction of an Iron Gates hydroelectric dam. Like his colleagues Pelin and Coșovei, he wrote texts in support of the controlled destruction—all three writers argued that the island was merely a relic of the past, standing in the way of industrial progress. From 1972 to 1973, Purcaru was deputy editor-in-chief at Înainte, holding a similar post at Scînteia Tineretului (1973–1974). He was then editor at Argeș magazine in 1974, and in 1974–1975 served as deputy editor-in-chief at Tribuna României, where Anghel was the manager.

The interview-collection Poezii și politică, put out by Editura Albatros in 1972, was applauded by reviewer George Pruteanu for its value as a "rare documentary"—since it included encounters with Paraschivescu, Vinea and Petre Pandrea, all of whom had since died; overall, Pruteanu notes, the interviews doubled as "scenarios for intellectual disputes." The book also featured Purcaru's talks with Păunescu, who had recently returned from a study trip in the United States, and expanded on themes of socialist patriotism. Therein, Păunescu explained himself as a committed left-winger, whose politics had been shaped by Paraschivescu, and who was therefore "terrified by some aspects of American culture": "Americans want money, money, money! They would pursue any business even if it contradicted their personal beliefs." Purcaru himself followed up with new works in the reportage genre: Țara Banilor (1972), Un elefant pentru doi oameni (1973), and Asaltul (1974). The second of these, advertised as a presentation of the world's "young civilizations", was named after the supposed 1/2 ratio of Indian elephants to humans in Laos. It described his travels in Southeast Asia, but also in Siberia, Alaska, and Cuba. His former colleague at Ramuri, Romulus Diaconescu, suggests that the work was praiseworthy for its descriptions of moods and landscapes, with influences from Mihail Sadoveanu. In Asaltul, Purcaru reconstructed the 1944 insurrection as played out in Craiova and Caracal, and specifically on the image of "communists lead[ing] the masses toward victory".

In a 1972 interview, Purcaru expressed his admiration of the constructors' class, arguing that their justified pride gave communized Romania an ongoing source of "social contradictions"—one which reporters needed to investigate. He explored such themes in the 1975 volume România – convergențe la universal. According to a review by Al. I. Friduș in Cronica weekly, it was a "seductive colloquium" of interviews, with, among others, Călinescu, Ion Barbu, Henri Coandă, Zoe Dumitrescu-Bușulenga, Stephen Fischer-Galați, Zoltán Franyó, Octav Onicescu, Alexandru Rosetti, and Henri H. Stahl. These were selected to have two unifying subjects, namely the universality of Romanian contributions in culture and science, and the "fundamental idea" defining Romanians as a people. Literary scholar Eugen Negrici identifies Purcaru, Păunescu and Anghel, alongside Eugen Barbu and Corneliu Vadim Tudor, as the journalists and writers most prone to serving the regime's national-communist propaganda after 1975. According to Negrici, these authors readily agreed to make the transition away from "honest reviews" of Romanian nationalism and into the realm of outright falsification. American anthropologist Katherine Verdery, who visited Romania in the 1980s, studied Purcaru as an exponent of "Protochronism", which constituted the most radical form of national-communism, by presuming Romanian world-primacy in various fields of culture. In his own words, Purcaru was rebelling against a "defeatist doctrine that divides the world into major and minor cultures", adding: "Protochronism seeks the annulment of norms that place a literature in excessive creative dependence and subordination to the values of other literatures." He was nevertheless among those who extended an offer of collaboration to the advocates of full Westernization, also called "Synchronists", in that he believed that the two currents shared the same ultimate agenda.

== Flacăra and Bunica Beps ==
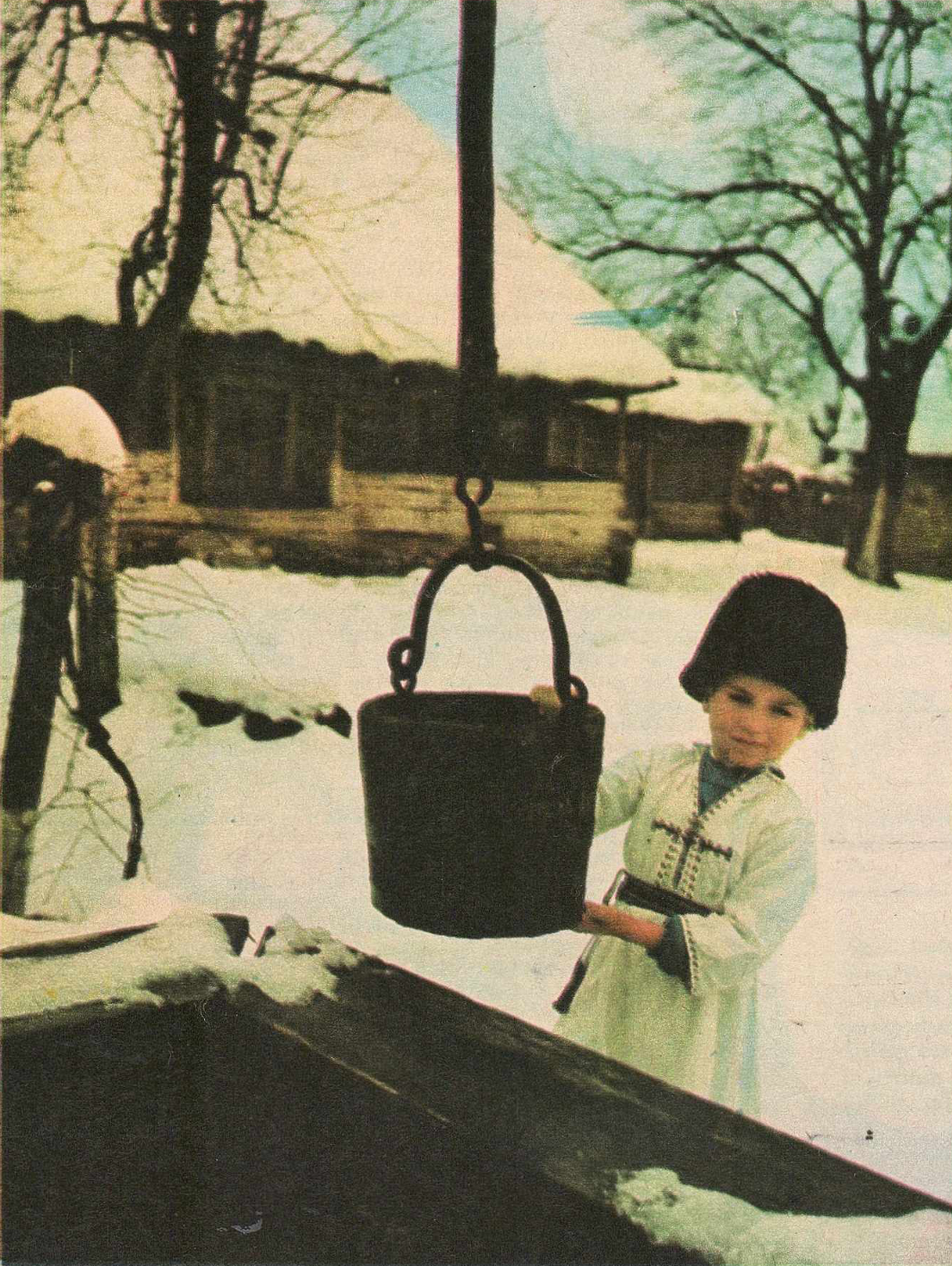
Ion Predoșanu's photograph, illustrating Purcaru's reportage in Hobița-Peștișani, at the family home of sculptor Constantin Brâncuși. Published with the caption: "From Brâncuși's own well, Dumitraș, who is the sculptor's great-great-grandnephew, drinks up a kind of water that many bystanders, obviously, hold to be the water of life"

Poenaru, who witnessed Purcaru's return trips to Râmnicu Vâlcea, notes that he continued to feed his alcohol problem by "engag[ing] in lengthy libations", to the point of neglecting his work. According to the same source, he would always collect his money in advance, spend it, then write his articles on the preceding night, scribbling them down in a small notebook. Purcaru's career was for a while threatened—according to Păunescu, he "was fired from all places", despite being a "great journalist." Verdery contrarily reports that the regime allowed Purcaru to engage in acts of corruption: "the protochronists were generally rescued from above in the numerous scrapes they got themselves into. [...] Paul Anghel and Ilie Purcaru were involved in a scandal concerning misappropriation of foreign currency from a journal they edited; yet although they were fired, their careers proceeded apace." From 1975 to 1987, Purcaru served as the editor of Flacăra weekly, having been brought there by Păunescu.

Micu notes that Purcaru's youthful romanticism had become more subdued in the collection Paralaxe la "Miorița" (1978); other works of the period include Încă 3 km până la Apele Vii (1976) and Planuri în lut (1979). Paralaxe was one of several works by Purcaru which provided a minute, monographic investigation of peasant life. Covering the work for Scînteia Tineretului, Ștefănescu recognized Bogza's influence, and declared himself put off by Purcaru's occasional "grandiloquence", but asserted that, overall, the book showed its author's "fantasy and sensibility", as well as an "authenticity of the lyrical élan". During his research, Purcaru had traveled to the Transylvanian village of Drăguș, retracing Stahl's sociological research, and meeting an unusually strong and industrious local, Bacioc, who had spent decades building himself a gigantic log house. Încă 3 km gathered impressions of his time with the peasants and rural craftsmen of Oltenia, with incursions in Arcani, Fîntîna Domnească, Runcu, and the eponymous Apele Vii. He described the fading-out of superstitions (by interviewing a peasant who had once believed that the sun was like "the mouth of a barrel"), the quick adoption of modern tools, but also the "fundamental honesty" of rural folk. In Planuri în lut and other writings, Purcaru is visibly alarmed by the destitution of ancestral villages in his native Vâlcea County, and especially in the isolated sub-region known as Țara Loviștei.

The reporter occasionally gave way to the poet, as with the volumes Bunica Beps (1974) and Geografii rebele (1984), and the commemorative piece Marșul de August (1980). Only the first of these three volumes is noted by Micu, who remarks that it relied on "tenderness, expressed with an intellectual humor reflecting a bookish source"; it earned the author another prize, granted by the Bucharest Writers' Association. Purcaru suffused this work with intertexual allusions to diverse authors of the 20th century—from Ștefan Octavian Iosif to Ion Barbu, Mateiu Caragiale, Radu Stanca, and especially Călinescu. According to Pelin, the volume also struck a serious note, showing Purcaru's "acute feeling of time", of his own self being wasted away. In an interview with Alice Diana Boboc, Purcaru would acknowledge the more playful side of his nature, including as a reporter, describing himself overall as a "good-natured fella". He also noted that poetry remained a pastime: "I am not one of those fortunate enough to be visited by poetic inspiration on a daily basis. It won't even visit me on Sundays."

Purcaru continued to receive awards, such as the Writers' Union of Romania Prize (1975) and the Craiova Writers' Association Prize (1980). His contribution at Flacăra included a 1981 exposé on some unpunished acts of mobbing. Though intended as a way of getting the authorities involved, it inspired Norman Manea to write his novel Plicul negru, which was a covert critique of Ceaușescu's supremacy. At that stage, Purcaru himself was openly critical of the regime's cultural policies, as was his painter friend Mihai Bandac. According to the latter, they feared Securitate reprisals, but were protected by Vadim Tudor, who knew a Securitate general, Aron Bordea. Purcaru remained supportive of Ceaușescu's personality cult, with contributions to a 1983 Festschrift called Omagiu președintelui țării, which was Oltenian-centered and put out by Scrisul Românesc of Craiova. The text, which included an account of Purcaru's visit to the Conducător's home village in Scornicești, was critically reread in 2006 by writer Angelo Mitchievici: "Ilie Purcaru gets strongly emotional [...]. The reporter, aided by the testimonials of simple folk, but also by those of [party] activists, reconstructs the history of this ancestral homeland, which has reached an unprecedented prosperity under the Gilded Epoch." Purcaru claimed to have witnessed the locals' enthusiasm about the effects of collectivization; he also reported his meeting with a mother of eleven, who had recollections about the Ceaușescu as a young communist being taken away by the old-regime Gendarmes. The oral accounts collected by Purcaru (and seen by fellow journalist Nicolae Coande as most likely mendacious) have it that, as a child, Ceaușescu walked in the nearby forest without ever fearing its wolves. As noted by Mitchievici, the narrative presented itself as unwitting evidence of national-communist "Messianism".

== Literatură și națiune ==
Purcaru spent much of that period interviewing other writers for Flacăra: in June 1983, he also became the last person to converse about literature with the ailing and exhausted Nichita Stănescu, recording "hints of a [Stănescu] testament". His 1981 conversation with Ion Lăncrănjan was affected by censorship, which cut out details on current politics and the formation of writer's "groups"—though all such mentions could be featured in Purcaru's collection, appearing in 1986 at Editura Eminescu as Literatură și națiune. The volume included Purcaru's own thoughts on the literary and political dispute between national-communists and liberals. In his encounter with literary historian Pompiliu Marcea, he included a positive reference to Ceaușescu's own critique of "cosmopolitanism" in art; with Eugen Barbu, he discussed supposed acts of betrayal by his former Ramuri colleague, Ion Caraion. As noted by Verdery, Purcaru had developed "one powerful way of undermining others' cultural representativeness", which was to "accuse them of 'elitism'." Further, "[his] message to a cognizant public is that it should reject the sorts of readings offered by these 'elitists,' who allegedly hold the intelligence of common readers and the values of rural folk in contempt." The same discourse was employed by his interviewee Artur Silvestri, who argued that those seeking to "depoliticize" literature were subject to ideological commands received from Radio Free Europe, and as such no less political then the national-communists.

Literatură și națiune was published at a time when disputes between liberals (who criticized Ceaușescu) and national-communists (who endorsed him) were turning increasingly virulent; the liberals accused their adversaries of being crypto-fascists, while the national-communists became interested in exposing the liberals for being frequently Jewish. The latter theory had been embraced in the 1970s by Eugen Barbu, whose period diaries describe Păunescu as intolerably philosemitic. According to Barbu, Flacăra was always primarily staffed by Jews, including after the reshuffle of that period; the "handful of Romanians [include] Purcaru, who was and always will be a great reporter." Siding with the national-communist intellectuals, a Securitate source alleged, already in 1980, that Purcaru and other Protochronists had found themselves marginalized as the "New Right" by intriguers, namely "a nonconformist group created around România Literară magazine, especially [including] those writers who are of Jewish nationality". Purcaru's interviews are analyzed by Verdery as an important piece of evidence regarding the magnitude of cultural debates under late-stage communism; in that context, he "provoked his interlocutors with leading questions about how 'certain critics' had attacked their work". The interviewees' language, she notes, had descended to "a level of linguistic violence suited only to a full-scale societal crisis." Florin Mugur, the Romanian Jewish poet and diarist, claimed that in January 1983 a drunken Purcaru phoned him at home from Flacăra's offices, angry that he was being made to remove portions of a text. According to Mugur, Purcaru blamed this continued censorship on voi, jidanii ("you, the kikes").

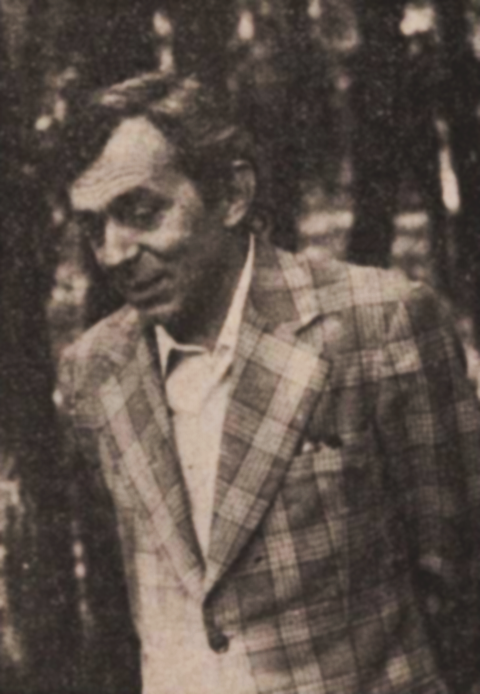
Ion Cucu's photograph of Purcaru in 1983

Although the Lăncrănjan interview appeared without cuts, this was probably not the case with other portions of the book. As reported by Verdery, the text featured "outrageous" attacks on the Writers' Union, for which reason Editura Eminescu "refused it outright". It was afterwards "pressured into accepting it, but only after cutting some interviews and toning down others." In the book itself, Purcaru had hinted that there was a conspiracy "against reediting certain writers; some of his protochronist interlocutors agreed with his opinions but others of them pointed to the quite objective difficulties of editing one or another writer's work." In its published form, Literatură și națiune still featured occasional answers from the liberal side. While Mircea Iorgulescu had specifically asked not to be interviewed by Purcaru, since the latter had once called him a sumbru condeier ("gloomy scribbler"), the liberal reply was carried by România Literară's Nicolae Manolescu. Manolescu was allowed to describe his own version of patriotism (implicitly defending himself against national-communist labels on his work), and also insisted that Protochronism, as a variant of patriotism, was flawed: "Our pride should not consist in being first but in being great." As Verdery notes, Manolescu hinted that the best way of dealing with his adversaries was to "refuse them a dialogue". Unwittingly, the Manolescu–Purcaru encounter also showed a number of similarities between the two opposing camps, since they were both irked by the state of cultural management under Ceaușescu: "They reflect real and understandable frustration at the reduced number of publications and the stiff competition to get one's works into print, a process in which it was insinuated that 'certain critics' or writers had undue influence (even though the real cause lay in the Party's cultural policy)."

Interviewing Purcaru shortly before the Romanian Revolution toppled communism, Verdery noted that he still produced some of "the most extreme protochronist statements"—on par with those by Anghel, Eugen Barbu, Lăncrănjan, Silvestri and Tudor, and much more radical than those aired by Păunescu or Constantin Noica. At the time, Purcaru also decried the near-disappearance of proletarian literature, arguing that its representation in Ceaușescu's Romania was below interwar levels. As he put it in 1984, "the drama of the petty bourgeois who was ruffled up by the revolution [...] is a more interesting subject for our writers than the colossal struggle of workers toward constructing a new Romania." In the mid-1986, he and fellow Protochronist Mihai Ungheanu wrote in support of Romania during a cross-border dispute with the Hungarian People's Republic. Specifically, they argued that the Hungarian-speaking Csángós in Western Moldavia were "a de-nationalised community of ethnic Romanians"—thus endorsing theories presented by Dumitru Mărtinaș, a grade-school teacher.

In parallel, Purcaru researched a book about the regional identity of Oltenia, appearing in 1988 as Carte cu olteni. Written primarily as a memoir in the style of Jean Cocteau, it mixed in fragments of dialogue, monograph, and biography (with portraits of cultural figures from Constantin Brâncuși to Magdalena Rădulescu). On Ceaușescu's 70th birthday in January of that year, he contributed to another Festschrift, put out by Editura Eminescu as Magistralele luminii. Here, he spoke of the "grandiose project of the Nicolae Ceaușescu Epoch", namely the "earth's rebuilding". Almost a full year ahead of the Revolution, he was again endorsing the personality cult, appearing as a narrator of the propaganda film Sub arcul de lumină al Epocii de aur (aired on national television just ahead of Ceaușescu's 71st birthday).

== 1989 Revolution and later life ==
Purcaru returned on national television during a live broadcast on 5 January, just days after Ceaușescu's trial and execution. According to his critics at România Literară, he used this opportunity to engage in a dispute with one of Ceaușescu's six prominent critics, who had "risked his liberty by going against the tyrant." România Literară suggested that Purcaru "ought to have spent this time at home, as a spectator." He still sought work in the post-revolutionary press, and, as early as January 1990, was a contributor to the newly launched Democrația daily. The following month, journalist Anemone Popescu spoke out against this publication as a "diversionary" enterprise, with Purcaru executing, "with only a slight delay caused by his alcoholism", orders received from the national-communist Eugen Florescu. Together, Florescu and Purcaru announced their intention of forming a "New Society Party".

Purcaru was then editor-in-chief of several short-lived publications, beginning in April 1990 with Fapta magazine. This was an also an organ of the Democratic Party of Labor, with an editorial staff which also included Protochronists Ungheanu and Ilie Bădescu (prompting the staff chronicler at România Literară to remark that it was "the defunct Luceafărul, rising out of its ashes"). Immediately after the launch, Purcaru entered a publicized polemic with Octavian Paler, editor-columnist at the more right-wing România Liberă; Paler reviewd the claims Fapta had made about his own past, describing them as "filthy delirium". In September 1992, Purcaru and fellow Fapta contributor Ieronim Buga were sued by former dissident Doina Cornea, whom they had both written about. They were found liable of defamation by a Paris court.

In 1990–1991, Purcaru was employed by Națiunea daily newspaper, which, during his tenure, was purchased by Iosif Constantin Drăgan and turned into a central organ of the nationalist Romanian Hearth Union. As reported by the Hungarian Romanian journal Média, Purcaru had embraced "extreme chauvinistic-nationalist views", but still had his contract terminated by Drăgan. After a stint at România Internațională magazine, in October 1992 he was announced as editorial secretary of Dimineața, a daily put out by Ion Iliescu's Democratic National Salvation Front. This followed an editorial reshuffle, with Purcaru being presented as a professional, voted in by his peers and vetted by Iliescu personally. Purcaru also worked as editor-in-chief and columnist at România Magazin, launched in March 1996 by fellow writer Fănuș Neagu. He was then also head editor at Regăsirea (1997). Purcaru's contribution to propaganda was being retrospectively reviewed by the anticommunist culture-critic Virgil Ierunca, in the 1994 essay Dimpotrivă. Ierunca dismissed his work as "state-run lying, with fervor and ineffable cynicism". Fellow journalist Șerban Cionoff argues that Purcaru sincerely welcomed the change of regime, though the emerging cultural figures had proceeded to marginalize him: "the spot that should have been reserved for betterment and for solidarity toward a durable creativity was taken by hatred, by murkiness, by a vigilantism of the Taliban rite".

Purcaru outlived his wife, who committed suicide by hanging in April 1995. His contributions to poetry were grouped as Mauzoleul Bunicii Beps, appearing in mid-1999. It was published by Agerpres, with a foreword and drawing by Marin Sorescu. According to România Literară, the volume was primarily hailed by likeminded writers such as Ungheanu and Neagu, whose chronicles failed to even mention their friend's career in propaganda. However, Mauzoleul was welcomed by Purcaru's adversaries at România Liberă, who enjoyed its "ceremonious [and] savant versification". Also in 1999, George Arion published a book of interviews, which included one with Purcaru. In 2001, he joined Păunescu's writing team at Flacăra lui Adrian Păunescu, which was founded in opposition to the old Flacăra. Victor Rusu, a former colleague in the communist press who had settled in Israel, exchanged letters with Purcaru, publishing them in 2007. These reveal Purcaru's frustration at having to work as a "mercenary" for the conceited Păunescu, especially since the job required "never stepping on the turf of any of the boss' partisans". He complained that his much younger colleagues were poorly educated, "scatterbrained, stammering as writers, at odds with logic and grammar, always but always miffed, unfed, and disabused." He also provided Rusu with scoops regarding the corruption in the ruling Social Democratic Party, alleging that its leader, Adrian Năstase, was buying off entire mountains for his own private use.

The former reporter republished all his Danube-themed prose as the volume Eu și Dunărea, appearing at Floarea Albastră of Bucharest in 2003. In February 2004, it was promoted with a special broadcast on Radio Craiova. In November of that year, he received the "Geo Bogza Award" at the Dolj County Autumn Gala. In December 2005, Ramuri celebrated its centennial (counted from the first edition of 1905). The ceremony, attended by Manolescu on behalf of the Writers' Union, saw Purcaru receiving a special award in recognition for his work. He also made return trips to his native city, where, in 2006, he reissued and completed some of his Vietnam-era writings, as Coșmar în junglă—published by the local company, Antim Ivireanul. The same company published a volume of his verse in both Romanian and French. It was released that same year with official backing and an international promotion (both of which were seen as distasteful by literary critic Dan C. Mihăilescu). The writer died in Bucharest on 10 October 2008, weeks before his 75th birthday, and was buried four days later at Străulești II Cemetery. He was survived by a daughter, Anda. By 2012, the Craiova section of the Writers' Union was granting an "Ile Purcaru Award"; in 2013, Antim Ivireanul issued Pro Honorem, a collection of texts in memory of Purcaru.
