= Orlea (river) =

- Location within Romania

Location
- Country: Romania
- Counties: Gorj County
- Villages: Sohodol, Costeni, Celei, Racoți

Physical characteristics
- Mouth: Tismana
  - coordinates: 44.9788°N 22.9481°E
- Length: 18 km (11 mi)
- Basin size: 88 km^{2} (34 sq mi)

Basin features
- Progression: Tismana→ Jiu→ Danube→ Black Sea
- Tributaries
  - left: Pocruia
- River code: VII.1.31.3

The Orlea is a right tributary of the river Tismana in Romania. It flows into the Tismana in Câlcești. Its length is 18 km (11 mi) and its basin size is 88 km^{2} (34 sq mi).
