= Tismana (river) =

- Location within Romania

Location
- Country: Romania
- Counties: Gorj County
- Villages: Tismana, Godinești, Câlnic

Physical characteristics
- Source: Vâlcan Mountains
- Mouth: Jiu
  - coordinates: 44.9532°N 23.1317°E
- Length: 42 km (26 mi)

Basin features
- Progression: Jiu→ Danube→ Black Sea
- Tributaries
  - left: Sohodol, Bistrița, Jaleș
  - right: Orlea

The Tismana is a right tributary of the river Jiu in Romania. It discharges into the Jiu near Șomănești. Its length is 42 km (26 mi) and its basin size is 894 km^{2} (345 sq mi). The 4 km long reach of the river, upstream of the Tismana Monastery is also known as Dorna.

== Tributaries ==
The following rivers are tributaries to the river Tismana (from source to mouth):

- Left: Crișanu, Tismănița, Valea lui Mareș, Sohodol, Câlnic, Icazna, Bistrița, Jaleș
- Right: Crișanu Nou, Păltinei, Geamănu, Gramna, Dosu Cioclovinei, Schitului, Cioclovina, Sașa, Orlea, Peșteana, Strâmba

== See also ==
- Lake Ceauru (project)
