= Sohodol (Tismana) =

- Location within Romania

Location
- Country: Romania
- Counties: Gorj County
- Villages: Topești, Vânăta

Physical characteristics
- Mouth: Tismana
  - coordinates: 45.0185°N 22.9530°E
- Length: 14 km (8.7 mi)
- Basin size: 66 km^{2} (25 sq mi)

Basin features
- Progression: Tismana→ Jiu→ Danube→ Black Sea
- Tributaries
  - left: Pârgavu, Vezieș
- River code: VII.1.31.2

The Sohodol is a left tributary of the river Tismana in Romania. It flows into the Tismana in Godinești. Its length is 14 km (8.7 mi) and its basin size is 66 km^{2} (25 sq mi).

== Etymology ==
"Sohodol" is a common noun of Slavic origin literally meaning "dry valley", with the connotation of being located in a karstic limestone area. It is a compound of soh ("dry, arid") and dol ("creek, ditch, valley").
