= Boboiești =

Boboiești may refer to several villages in Romania:

- Boboiești, a village in Ciuperceni Commune, Gorj County
- Boboiești, a village in Pipirig Commune, Neamț County
