= Seuca =

Seuca may refer to two places in Romania:

- Seuca, a village in Peștișani Commune, Gorj County
- Seuca, a village in Găneşti Commune, Mureș County
