= Vârtopu =

Vârtopu may refer to several villages in Romania:

- Vârtopu, a village in Ciuperceni Commune, Gorj County
- Vârtopu, a village in the town of Corabia, Olt County
