= Bistrița (Tismana) =

Bistrița Bistrița Gorjană
- Location within Romania

Location
- Country: Romania
- Counties: Gorj
- Villages: Gureni, Peștișani, Hobița, Telești

Physical characteristics
- Source: Vâlcan Mountains, Mount Oslea
- Mouth: Tismana
  - coordinates: 44.9608°N 23.1309°E
- Length: 45 km (28 mi)
- Basin size: 274 km^{2} (106 sq mi)

Basin features
- Progression: Tismana→ Jiu→ Danube→ Black Sea
- Tributaries
  - left: Bâlta
  - right: Bistricioara

The Bistrița (Romanian pronunciation: [ˈbistritsa]), sometimes identified as Bistrița Gorjană, is a right tributary of the river Tismana in Romania. It discharges into the Tismana near Șomănești. Its source is in the Vâlcan Mountains. Its length is 45 km (28 mi) and its basin size is 274 km^{2} (106 sq mi).

== Tributaries ==
The following rivers are tributaries to the river Bistrița (from source to mouth):

- Left: Negoiu, Văratecu, Vâja, Valea Lungă, Becheru, Mărului, Găunoasa, Viilor, Bâlta
- Right: Lespezel, Salcia, Lupului, Frasinu, Padeșu, Boului, Bistricioara, Ogașu Hobiței

== See also ==
- Lake Ceauru (project)
