= Viilor River =

Viilor River may refer to:

- Viilor, a tributary of the Bistrița in Gorj County, Romania
- Viilor River (Someș), in Bistrița-Năsăud County, Romania
