= Zăpodia River =

Zăpodia River may refer to:

- Zăpodia, a tributary of the Bâlta in Gorj County, Romania
- Zăpodia River (Neagra Șarului), in Suceava County, Romania
