= Lake Ceauru (project) =

Artificial lake project in Romania

Coordinates: 44.95459°N 23.16012°E

Lake Ceauru (Romanian: Lacul Ceauru) is the name of a project to build an artificial lake in Romania. The work was commissioned in 1965 and the lake was to be fed from the waters of four rivers. The project was reported as completed, but only the initial building phase was carried out. Three billion lei were allocated and spent on the lake, which was supposed to cover about 200 km^{2}, have a capacity of 150 million m^{3}, and be located south-west of Târgu Jiu, Gorj County. Lake Ceauru still appears on maps as of 2007.

== History ==
Work on Lake Ceauru, conceived as a man-made lake behind a dam into which the waters of the rivers Jiu, Tismana, Bistrița and Jaleș would flow, began in 1965. The last three rivers were diverted in order to fill the lake. Projects and studies were undertaken prior to the start of work. Following expropriation decree 1037/1965 that June, the over 2,500 inhabitants of three villages (Bălăcești, Ceauru and Șomănești) were moved by autumn, and the existing houses demolished. In 1968 the project was reported as complete to Nicolae Ceaușescu, and it began to appear on maps.

Only the first phase was ever completed. A dike was built around the planned lake, and a weir constructed, through which the mingled waters of the four rivers were supposed to pass. Phase two involved the building of an actual dam, with a system for closing the weir. Two functions were designated for the Ceauru Dam: to absorb floodwaters when needed, to protect the mines in the region and to supply the downstream communities, as well as the Rovinari Power Station, then under construction.

The failure to complete the project was exposed when a high-ranking dignitary of the Romanian Communist Party paid a visit. All the leading members of the construction team were arrested, and the director, a certain Dăncescu, was sentenced to death. Eventually, Ceaușescu commuted his sentence to 20 years' imprisonment and sent him to work on the Danube-Black Sea Canal, where he died. Local rumour suggests that the project directors used construction materials and funds for their own gain, building a number of villas with these.

A dedicated intake was eventually built downstream from the planned Lake Ceauru for the Rovinari power station. This is considered an imperfect solution, as during a drought, both Rovinari and Turceni (located 40 km downstream) would no longer be supplied, instead being forced to recirculate cooling water, or else halt operations.

== Legacy ==
In 2007, the mayor of Telești, Constantin Drăghici, suggested that because a forest has been allowed to grow inside, tree trunks would block the weir in case of flooding, and a deluge could break open the dike. The head of the Gorj County Water Management Service countered at the time that the dike and weir are maintained by his company and that the lake bottom is being cultivated by the former owners (who have received proper title to the land). He admitted that a forest does exist and could be flooded, but dismissed the notion of a flood uprooting trees, predicting that any floodwaters would subside in up to six days.

The lake still appeared on maps as of 2007 either as Lake Ceauru or as Lake Rovinari. In interviews, officials lamented the situation but blamed the lake's continuing depiction on bureaucratic obstacles.
