= Priporu =

Priporu may refer to several villages in Romania:

- Priporu, a village in Ciuperceni Commune, Gorj County
- Priporu, a village in Vlădeşti Commune, Vâlcea County
