= Apa Vie =

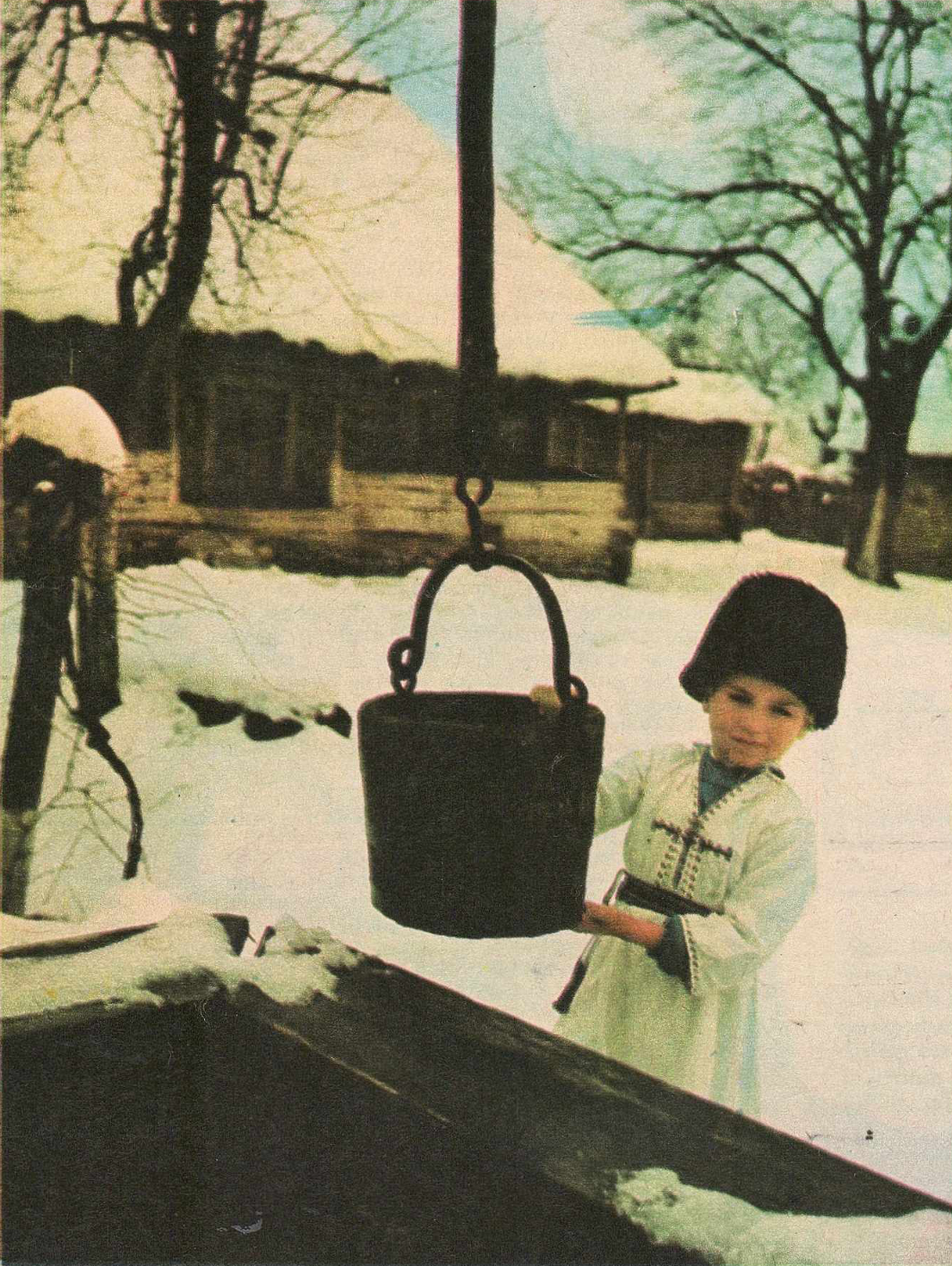
Ion Predoșanu's photograph, illustrating Ilie Purcaru's reportage in Hobița-Peștișani, at the family home of sculptor Constantin Brâncuși. Published in 1976 with the caption: "From Brâncuși's own well, Dumitraș, who is the sculptor's great-great-grandnephew, drinks up a kind of water that many bystanders, obviously, hold to be the water of life"

In Romanian mythology, apa vie (literally translated as "Living Water" but more accurately as "Water of Life") means the water from which heroes drink so that they come back to life after healing their wounds. Apa moartǎ ("Dead Water" or "Water of Death") is the complement of apa vie. In the vast majority of the tales it has the power to heal wounds of dead bodies (but not to give life). Usually, reviving a dead person is done (in such tales) by putting this Dead Water on their wounds to heal them and then bring them back to life with Living Water, because the Living Water cannot heal the wounds of the dead, and even revived, the people would still bleed to death without being healed first. There is a small percent of tales in which apa moartǎ is a poisonous drink that kills any person who drinks it.

Examples of the use of apa vie can be found in the fairy tales "Prâslea the Brave and the Golden Apples" and "Greuceanu."
