= Peșteana (Tismana) =

- Location within Romania

Location
- Country: Romania
- Counties: Gorj County
- Villages: Ciuperceni

Physical characteristics
- Mouth: Tismana
  - coordinates: 44.9540°N 23.0241°E
- Length: 12 km (7.5 mi)
- Basin size: 51 km^{2} (20 sq mi)

Basin features
- Progression: Tismana→ Jiu→ Danube→ Black Sea
- Tributaries
  - right: Vârtop
- River code: VII.1.31.4

The Peșteana is a right tributary of the river Tismana in Romania. It flows into the Tismana near Ciuperceni. Its length is 12 km (7.5 mi) and its basin size is 51 km^{2} (20 sq mi).
