= Mihai Pelin =

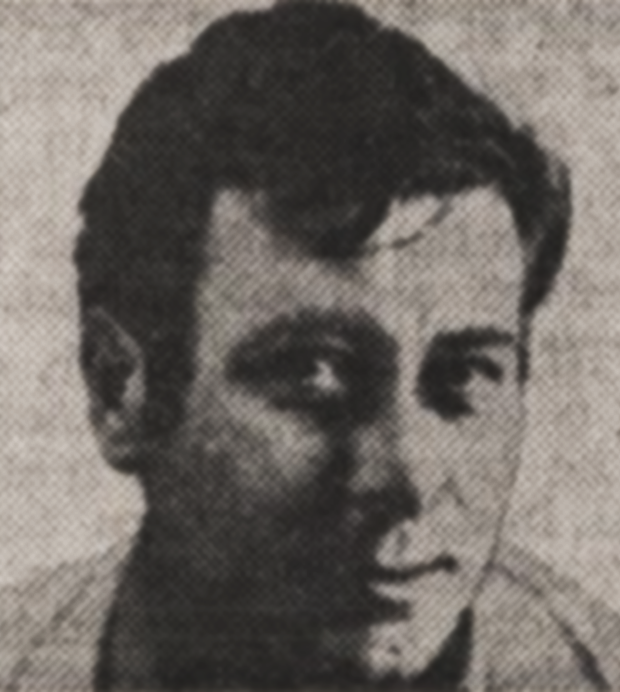
- Pelin in 1978
- Born: 25 August 1940; Cernăuți (Chernivtsi), Soviet-occupied Bukovina
- Died: 14 December 2007 (aged 67); Fundeni Hospital, Bucharest, Romania
- Resting place: Străulești II Cemetery
- Education: University of Bucharest
- Occupations: writer, historian
- Years active: 1967–2007
- Children: 1
- Website: mihaipelin.wordpress.com

Mihai Pelin (25 August 1940 – 14 December 2007) was a Romanian writer and historian who was known for researching Italy's role during World War II and the history of the Romanian secret services (especially of the Securitate).

== Biography ==
Mihai Pelin was born towards the end of August 1940 in Cernăuți, which had been occupied by the Soviet Union two months earlier. His father, Spiridon, was a railway worker while his mother was a housewife, and a part of his family had Polish and German roots. During World War II, Pelin spent his time with his grandmother in Bessarabia along with German troops, before leaving for Bucharest in 1944.

He graduated from the Faculty of Philosophy at the University of Bucharest and in his early years he was a journalist for various magazines and newspapers, including Flacăra and Scânteia Tineretului. His first written work was published in 1967, and he later moved to the city of Craiova in 1972. In 1977, at the centenary of the Romanian War of Independence (which was fought as part of the Russo-Ottoman war), he published "The fall of Plevna", which gained him a prize from the Writers' Union of Romania.

Pelin returned to Bucharest in 1981, moving into a newly finished apartment block near Obor, where he lived until his death. During the 1980s, he began researching the role of Italy in the Eastern Front of World War II, frequently travelling to cities such as Milan and Venice. He began gaining notoriety after the Romanian Revolution of 1989, when he intensified his travels to Italy and began to openly write about the history of the secret services in Romania, especially through his work "The white files of the Securitate", published in the mid 1990s. He also documented the history of Romania from the late 1930s to the early 1950s, writing books which highlighted the life of the intelligentsia of the era and the wartime efforts of the Axis.

In 2006, Pelin was named Commander of the Order of Italian Solidarity for researching into the lives and works of Italian medical staff during World War II and their humanitarian efforts, and the tales of the Italian diplomatic staff in the early communist era. He received the prize from the Italian ambassador Danielle Mancini.

A known smoker and drinker, Pelin was hospitalized during 2007 at Fundeni Hospital, where he eventually died from cirrhosis at the end of the year. His last work, whose subject was the Iași pogrom of 1941, was published posthumously in 2008.

=== Written works ===
- Redactori și pianiști, 1967
- Inaderență, 1968
- Miorița nu s-a născut lângă stele, 1973
- Căderea Plevnei, 1977
- Șa pierdută pe mare, 1983
- Speranța, 1984
- Requiem pentru Convenția de la Geneva (1st ed.). Veneția: Nagard. 1988. OCLC 23603330.*** (2nd ed.). București: Paco. 1996. OCLC 43572750.
- Epistolarul Infernului (1993)
- Sioniști sub anchetă (1993)
- Legendă și adevăr (1994)
- Istorii literare și artistice (1996)
- Cărțile albe ale Securității (1996–1997)
- Culisele spionajului românesc (1997)
- Miza războiului (1998)
- Operațiunile Melița și Eterul. Istoria Europei Libere prin documente de Securitate. București: Albatros. 1999. ISBN 9732406070. OCLC 45368289.
- ARTUR – Dosarul lui Ion Caraion (2001)
- Iluziile lui Iuliu Maniu (2 vol, 2001–2002)
- Opisul emigrației politice: destine în 1222 de fișe alcătuite pe baza dosarelor din arhivele Securității. București: Compania. 2002. ISBN 9738119502. OCLC 51914847.
- Genii și analfabeți (2002)
- Italieni, vă ordon, treceți Prutul! (2003)
- Un veac de spionaj, contraspionaj și poliție politică (2003)
- SIE & SRI – Trecutul nu se prescrie (2004)
- Viețile pictorilor, sculptorilor și arhitecților români între legionari și staliniști (2005)
- Diplomație de război, România-Italia 1939–1945 (2005)
- Raidul escadrei trădate, 2005
- Deceniul prăbușirilor (1940–1950): viețile pictorilor, sculptorilor și arhitecților români între legionari și staliniști, 2005
- Marele rapt regal (2006)
- Săptămâna Patimilor (23-28 iunie 1940), 2008
