= Tismana =

- Town
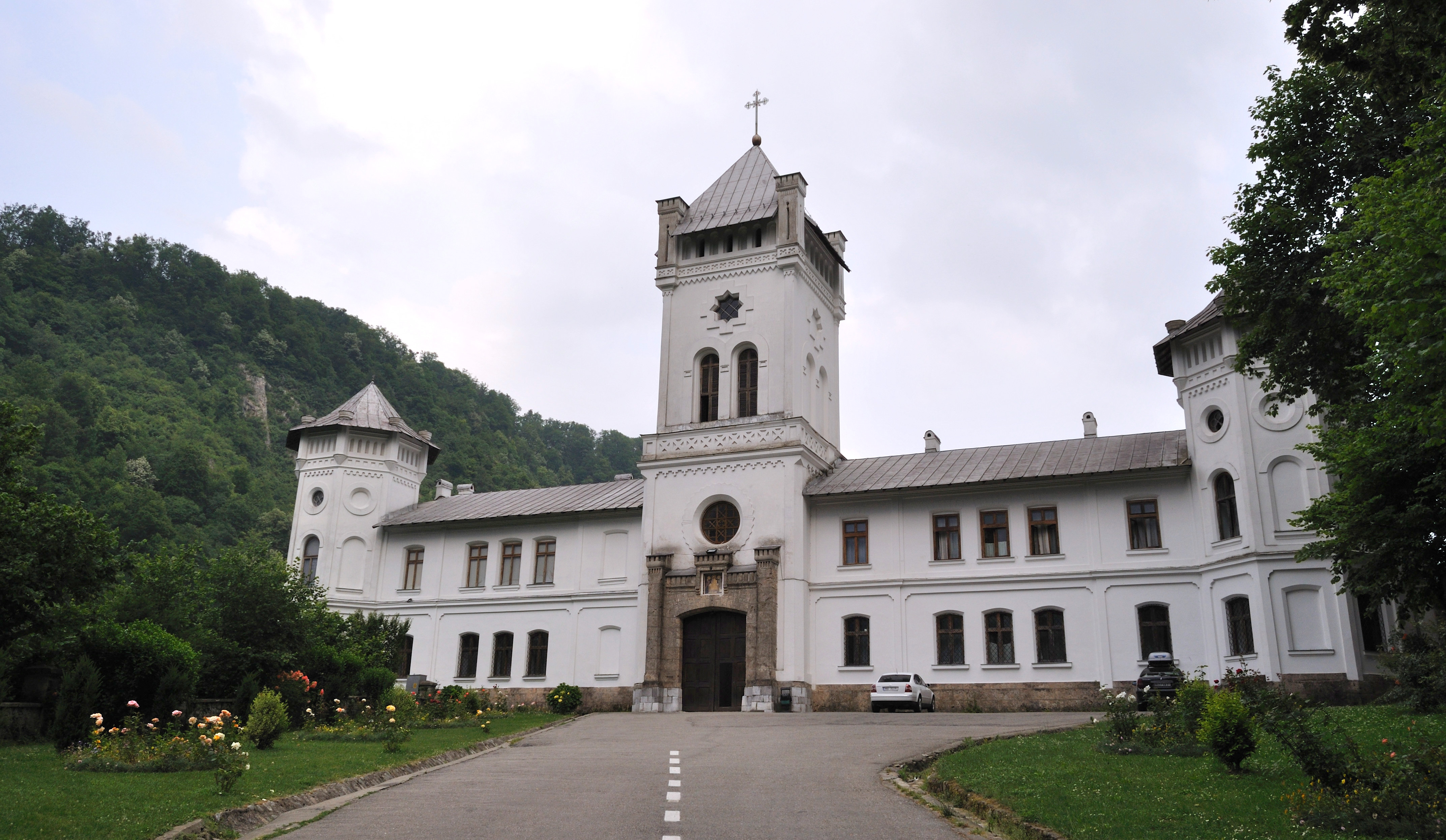
- Tismana Monastery

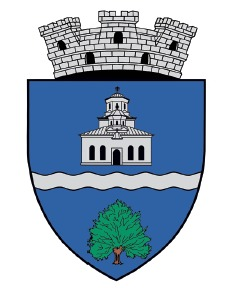
- Coat of arms

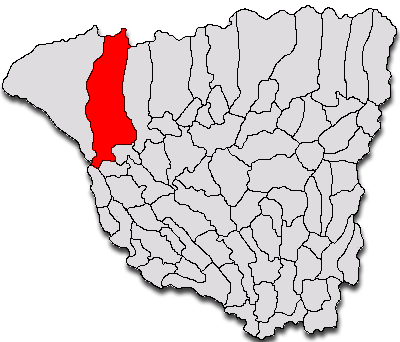
- Location in Gorj County

- Location in Romania
- Coordinates: 45°03′02″N 22°56′56″E
- Country: Romania
- County: Gorj
- Subdivisions: Celei, Costeni, Gornovița, Isvarna, Pocruia, Racoți, Sohodol, Topești, Vâlcele, Vânăta

Government
  - Mayor (2024–2028): Narcis-Petre Remetea (PSD)
- Area: 307.7879 km^{2} (118.8376 sq mi)
- Highest elevation: 1,946 m (6,385 ft)
- Lowest elevation: 198 m (650 ft)
- Population (2021-12-01): 6,359
  - Density: 20.66/km^{2} (53.51/sq mi)
- Time zone: UTC+02:00 (EET)
  - Summer (DST): UTC+03:00 (EEST)
- Postal code: 217495
- Area code: (+40) 02 53
- Vehicle reg.: GJ
- Website: primariatismana.ro

Tismana is a town in Gorj County, Oltenia, Romania. It administers ten villages: Celei, Costeni, Gornovița, Isvarna, Pocruia, Racoți, Sohodol, Topești, Vâlcele, and Vânăta.

== History ==
During the Byzantine period, Tismana was a major center of hesychasm when Nicodemus of Tismana built a monastery in Tismana during the 1300s.

== Demographics ==
At the 2021 census, Tismana has a population of 6,359. This marked a decrease from the 2011 census, when the population was 6,862, and from 2002, when it was 7,894.

Historical population
Year	Pop.	±%
2002	7,894	—
2011	6,862	−13.1%
2021	6,359	−7.3%
Source: Census data

== Notable people ==
- Nicodemus of Tismana (c. 1320 – 1406)
