= Godinești =

- Commune
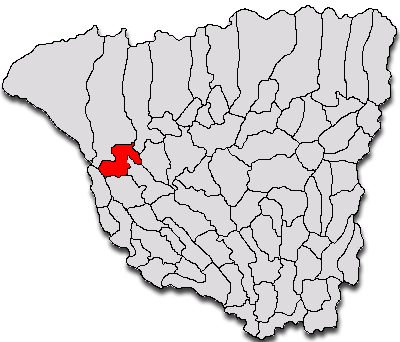
- Location in Gorj County

- Location in Romania
- Coordinates: 45°00′N 22°58′E
- Country: Romania
- County: Gorj
- Subdivisions: Arjoci, Câlcești, Chiliu, Godinești, Pârâu de Pripor, Pârâu de Vale, Rătez

Government
  - Mayor (2020–2024): Coman Aurariu (PNL)
- Area: 51.32 km^{2} (19.81 sq mi)
- Population (2021-12-01): 1,855
  - Density: 36.15/km^{2} (93.62/sq mi)
- Time zone: UTC+02:00 (EET)
  - Summer (DST): UTC+03:00 (EEST)
- Vehicle reg.: GJ

Godinești is a commune in Gorj County, Oltenia, Romania. It is composed of seven villages: Arjoci, Câlcești, Chiliu, Godinești, Pârâu de Pripor, Pârâu de Vale and Rătez.
