= Peștișani =

- Commune
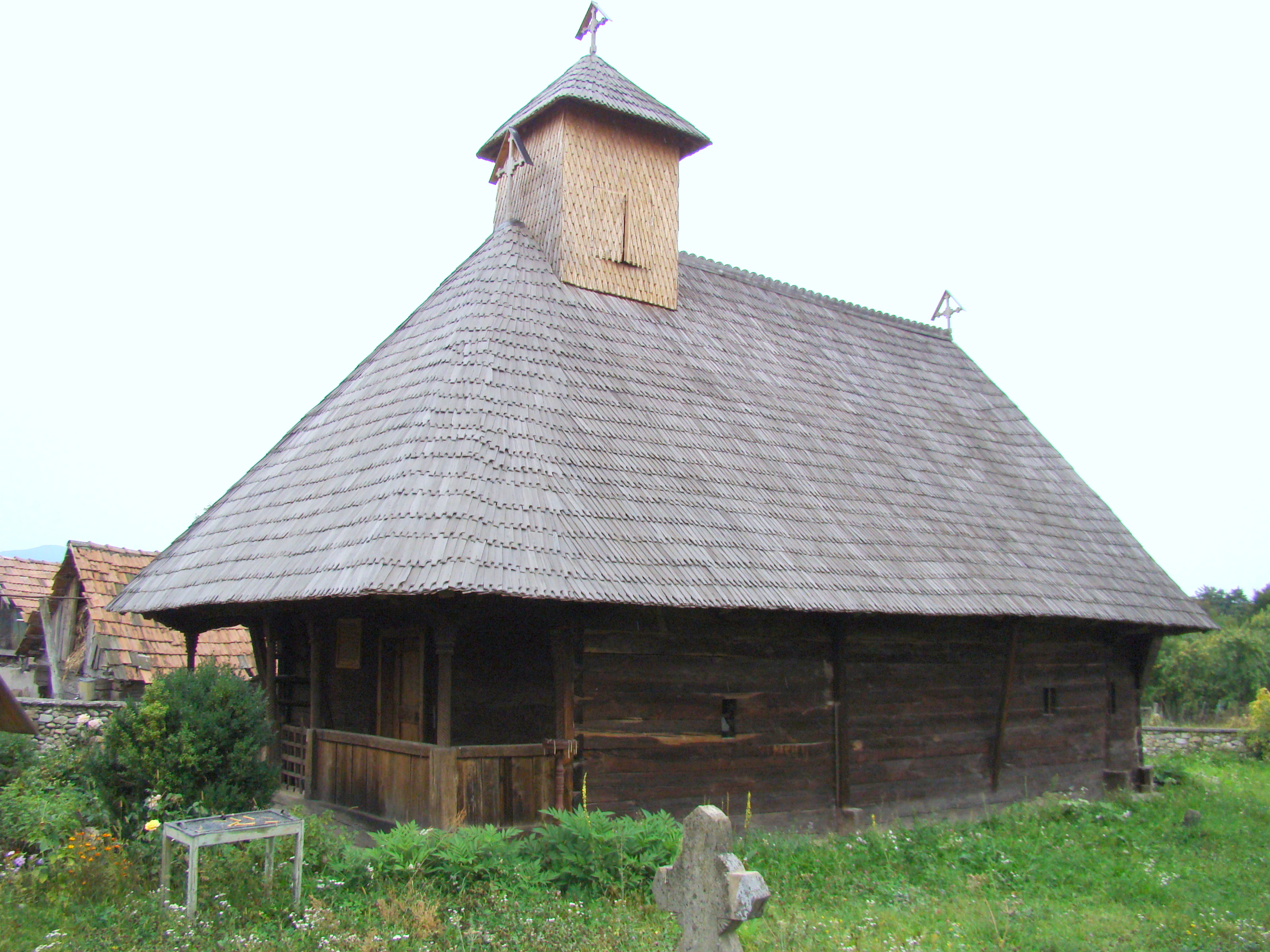
- Wooden church in Peștișani

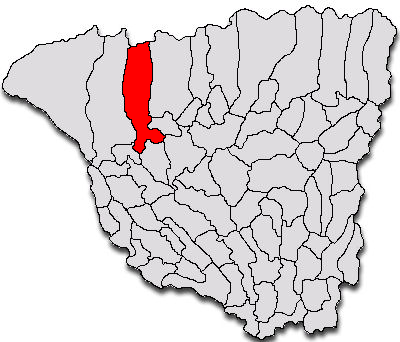
- Location in Gorj County

- Location in Romania
- Coordinates: 45°04′N 23°02′E
- Country: Romania
- County: Gorj
- Subdivisions: Boroșteni, Brădiceni, Frâncești, Gureni, Hobița, Peștișani, Seuca

Government
  - Mayor (2020–2024): Cosmin Pigui (PSD)
- Area: 216.87 km^{2} (83.73 sq mi)
- Elevation: 256 m (840 ft)
- Highest elevation: 1,946 m (6,385 ft)
- Lowest elevation: 200 m (660 ft)
- Population (2021-12-01): 3,535
  - Density: 16.30/km^{2} (42.22/sq mi)
- Time zone: UTC+02:00 (EET)
  - Summer (DST): UTC+03:00 (EEST)
- Postal code: 217335
- Area code: +(40) 253
- Vehicle reg.: GJ
- Website: www.pestisani.ro

Peștișani (Romanian: [peʃtiˈʃanʲ]) is a commune in Gorj County, Oltenia, Romania. It is composed of seven villages: Boroșteni, Brădiceni, Frâncești, Gureni, Hobița, Peștișani, and Seuca.

Hobița village is the birthplace of sculptor Constantin Brâncuși.

Peștișani is attested by the Romanian Government as a tourist resort of local interest.

== Geography ==
Peștișani is located 20 km (12 mi) west of Târgu Jiu, the seat of Gorj County, on the national road DN67D. Positioned in the southern part of the Carpathian Mountains, specifically in the Getic Subcarpathians, on the Bistrița River, Peștișani has a Mediterranean climate. Its altitude ranges from 200 m (660 ft) in the southern part to close to 2,000 m (6,600 ft) in the northern part, where we can find the Oslea Peak (1,946 m), the highest point in the Vâlcan Mountains.

== Demographics ==
At the 2021 census, the commune had a population of 3,535, of which 95,36% were Romanians. The population density is about 16 people per square kilometre.

== History ==
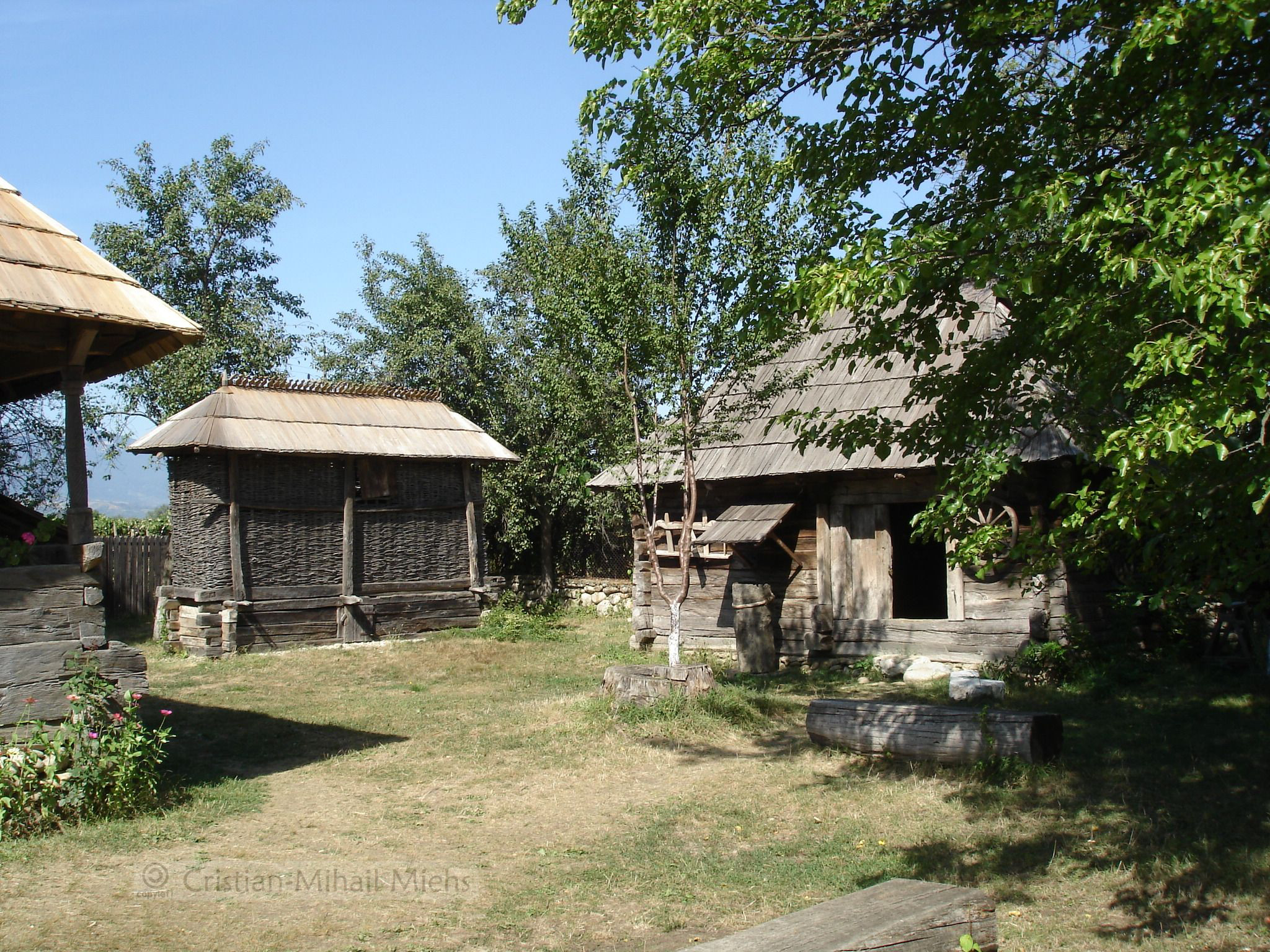
Constantin Brâncuși memorial house in Hobița

Peștișani is mentioned through its name for the first time in a document of Vladislav II of Wallachia, dated 5 August 1451, but its lands and territories are also mentioned in a 1385 document of Dan I of Wallachia (Dan Vodă). The village Boroșteni (originally called Borăsul, then Borăști, and eventually Boroșteni) is mentioned for the first time in a document in 1509, Brădiceni in 1518, Frâncești in 1584, Gureni in 1525, Hobița (originally called Chobița) in 1518, and Seuca in 1586.

Roman vestiges, ceramic/bronze figurines, and coins dating secol I-II have been found in Boroșteni (in a place known as "Scaunul Turcului", next to "Conacul Brăiloaiei"), in Brădiceni (in a place known as "Beciuri"), in Frâncești (in a place known as "Seninul"), and in Gureni (in a place known as "Ciocanul Ursului").

Crow's Cave (Peștera Cioarei), located in Boroșteni, was inhabited by Neanderthal more than 50,000 years ago, making it the oldest paleolithic habitat from Romania and one of the oldest in Europe.
