= Ciuperceni, Gorj =

Ciuperceni
- Commune
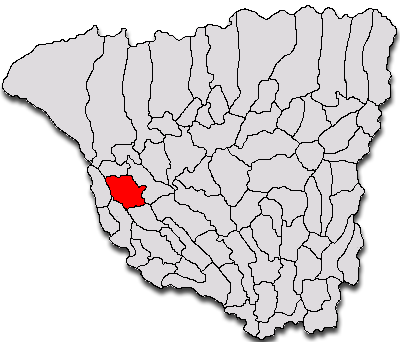
- Location in Gorj County

- Location in Romania
- Coordinates: 44°56′N 23°01′E
- Country: Romania
- County: Gorj
- Subdivisions: Boboiești, Ciuperceni, Peșteana-Vulcan, Priporu, Strâmba-Vulcan, Vârtopu, Zorzila
- Area: 70.07 km^{2} (27.05 sq mi)
- Population (2021-12-01): 1,528
  - Density: 21.81/km^{2} (56.48/sq mi)
- Time zone: UTC+02:00 (EET)
  - Summer (DST): UTC+03:00 (EEST)
- Vehicle reg.: GJ

Ciuperceni is a commune in Gorj County, Oltenia, Romania, composed of seven villages: Boboiești, Ciuperceni, Peșteana-Vulcan, Priporu, Strâmba-Vulcan, Vârtopu and Zorzila.
