= Telești =

- Commune
- Location in Romania
- Coordinates: 45°00′N 23°05′E
- Country: Romania
- County: Gorj
- Subdivisions: Buduhala, Șomănești, Telești
- Population (2021-12-01): 3,047
- Time zone: EET/EEST (UTC+2/+3)
- Vehicle reg.: GJ

Telești is a commune in Gorj County, Oltenia, Romania. It is composed of three villages: Buduhala, Șomănești and Telești.
