= Vâlcan Mountains =

Mountain range in Romania

Coordinates: 45°14′09″N 22°53′25″E

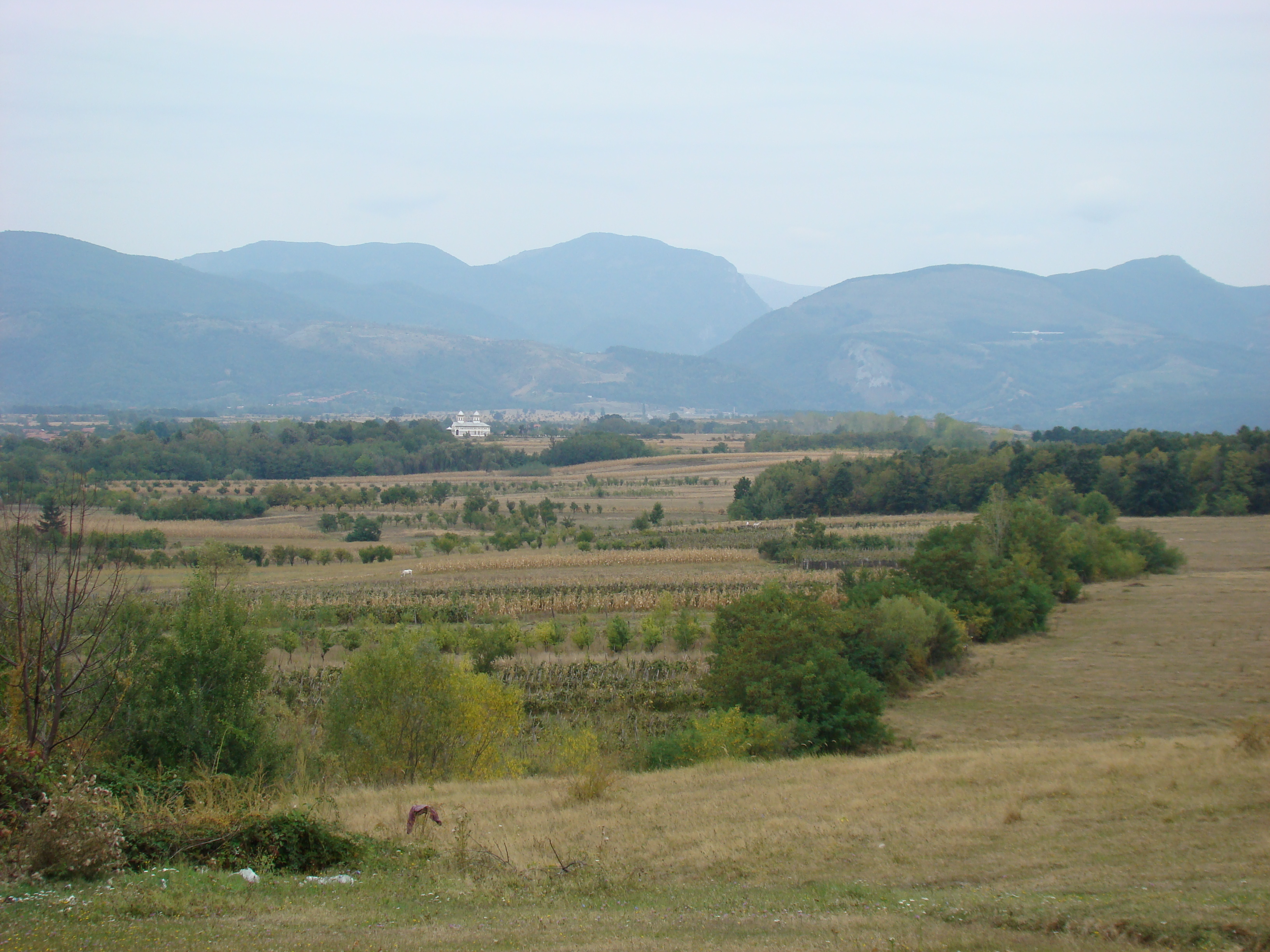
South-Eastern side of Vâlcan Mountains viewed from Lelești

The Vâlcan Mountains are a chain of mountains in the Southern Carpathians in Gorj County, Romania. They are part of the Retezat-Godeanu Mountains group, and run for approximately 54 kilometres (34 mi). The highest point is Oslea Peak at 1,946 metres (6,385 ft), and the second highest is Straja at 1,848 metres (6,063 ft). The mountains run the length of the Jiu Valley, and serve as a barrier to entry on the southern side of the valley.

== Photo gallery ==
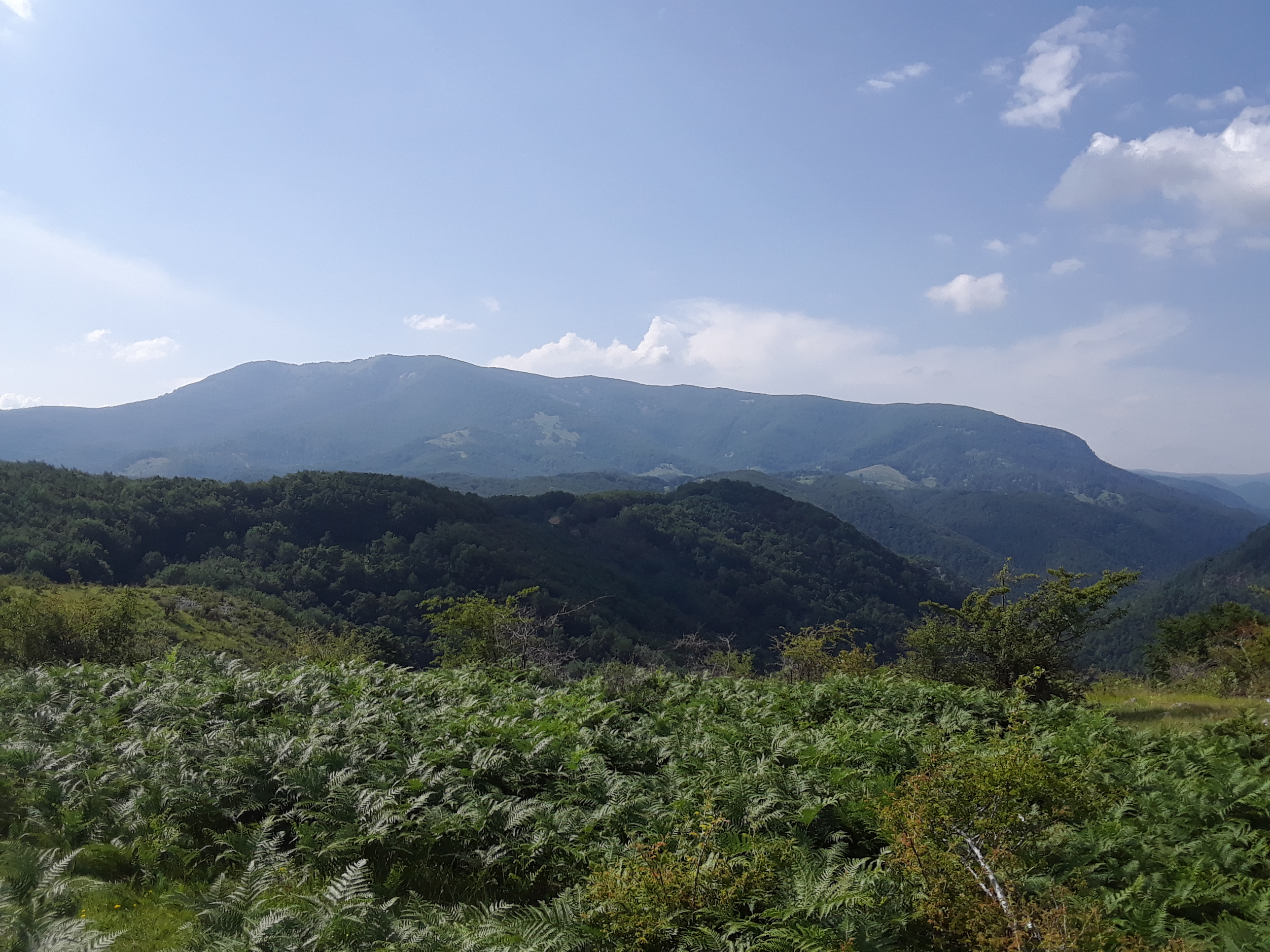
Plesa peak 1,470 metres (4,820 ft) seen from Cornetul mountain.

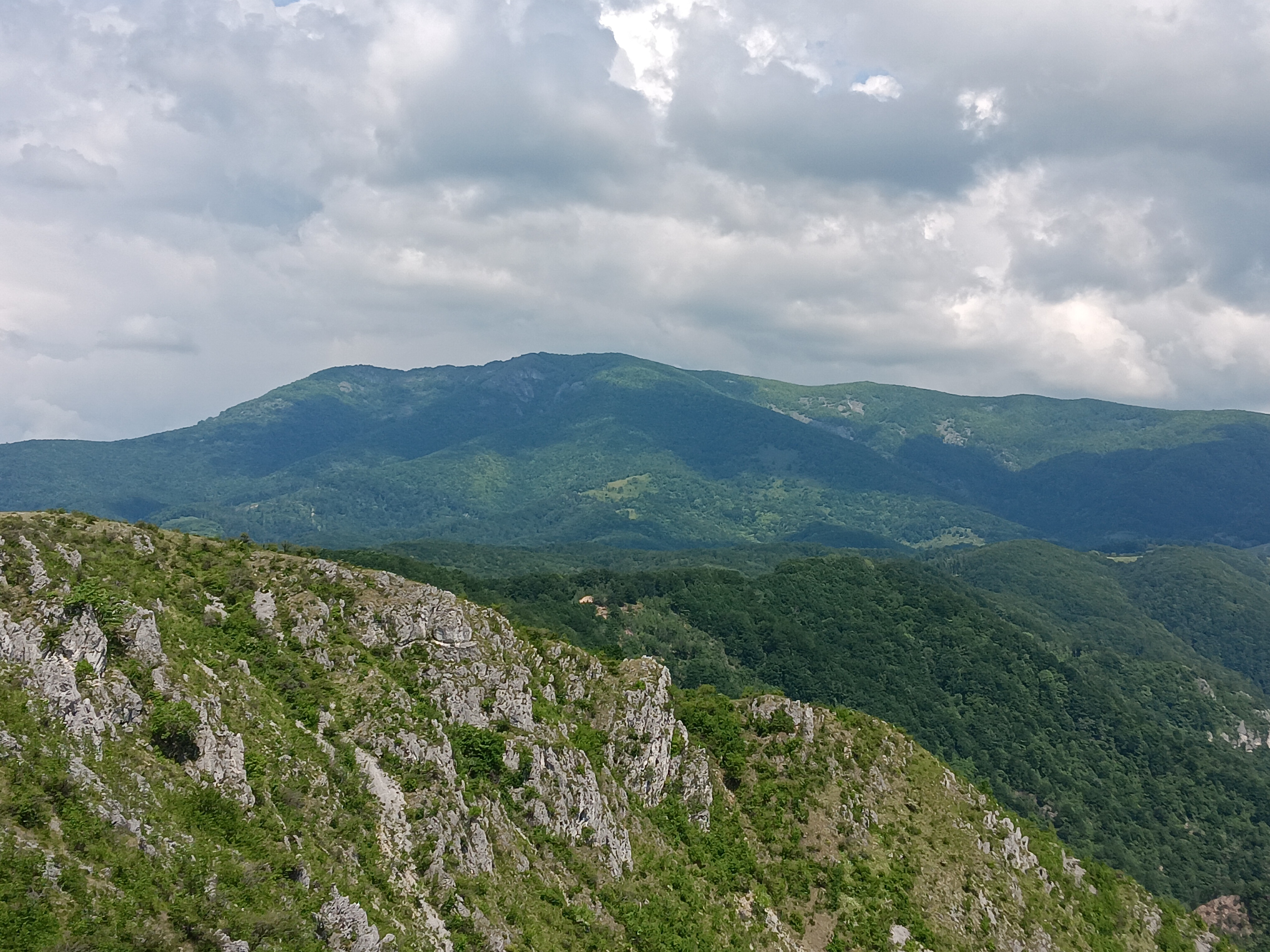
Plesa peak seen from Cornetul mountain.

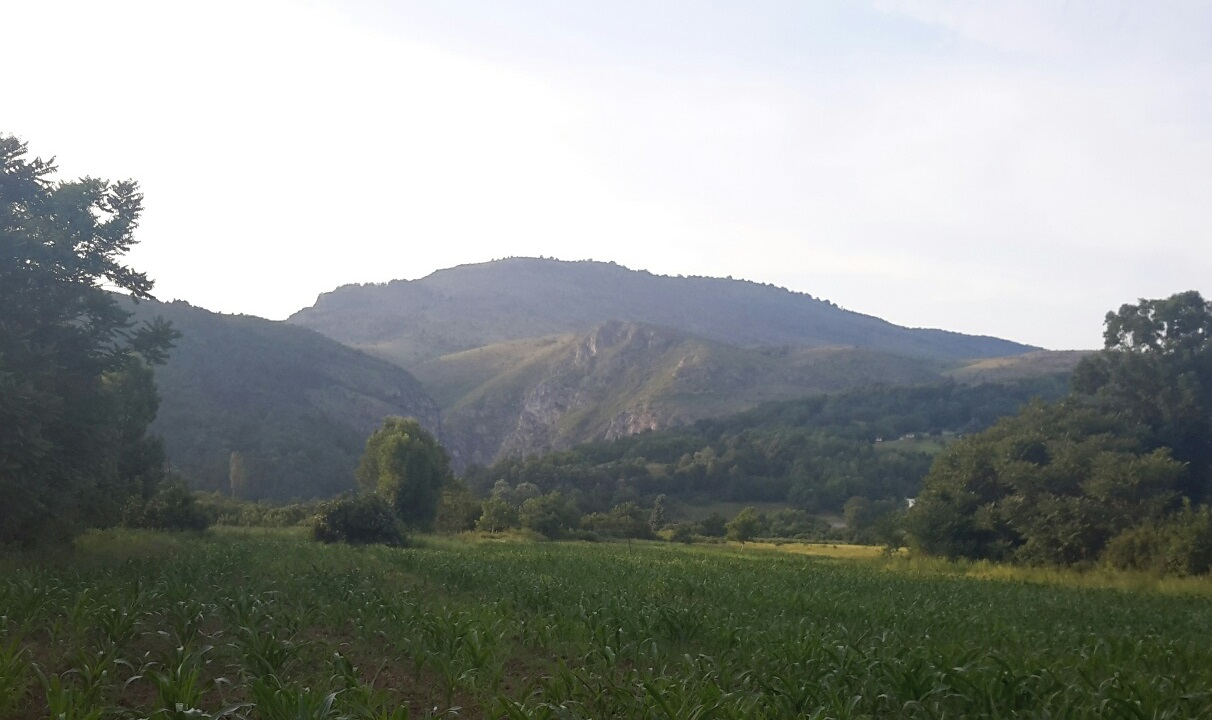
Tufoaia mountain.

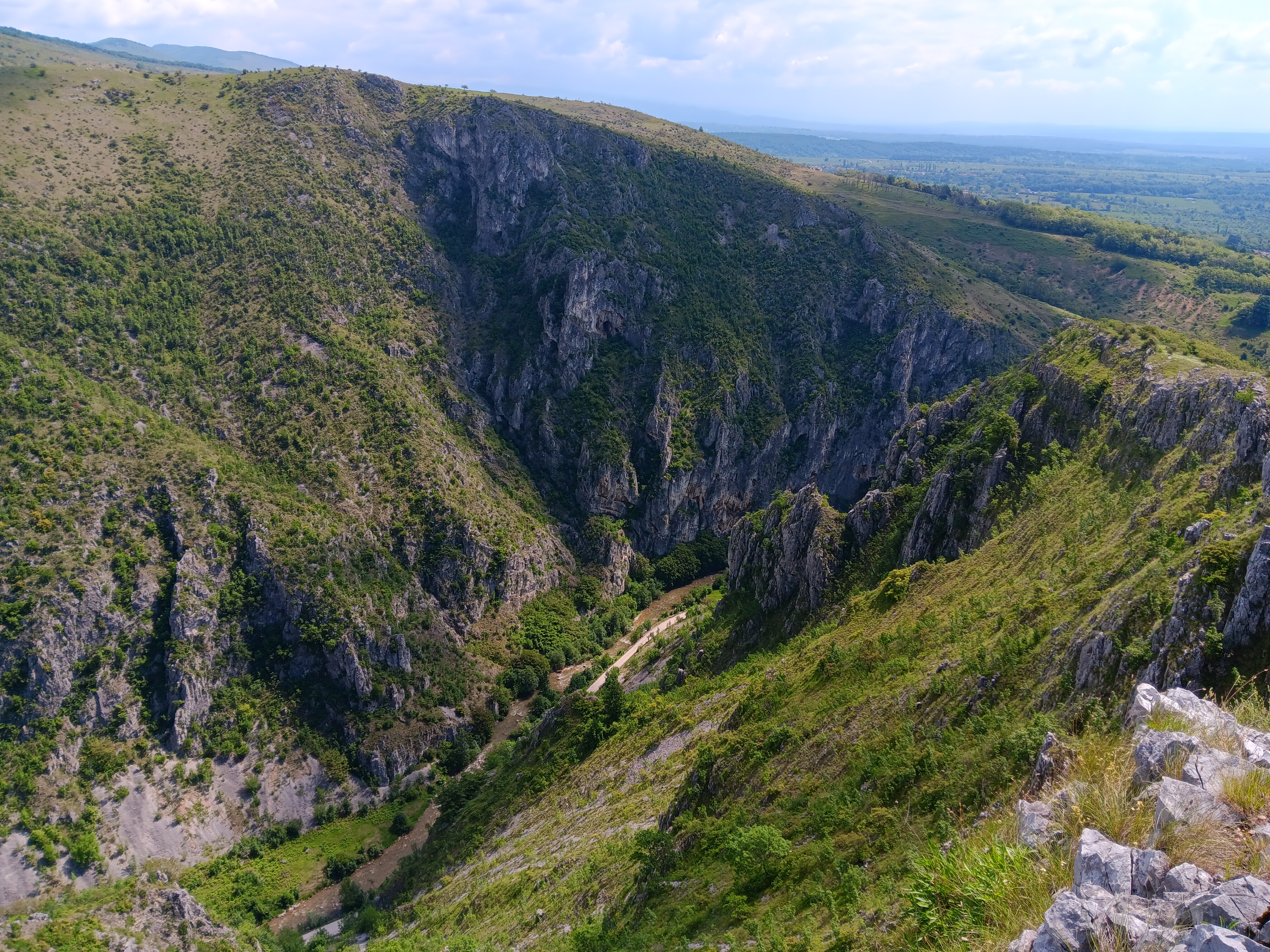
Sohodol Gorge viewed from Cornetu mountain

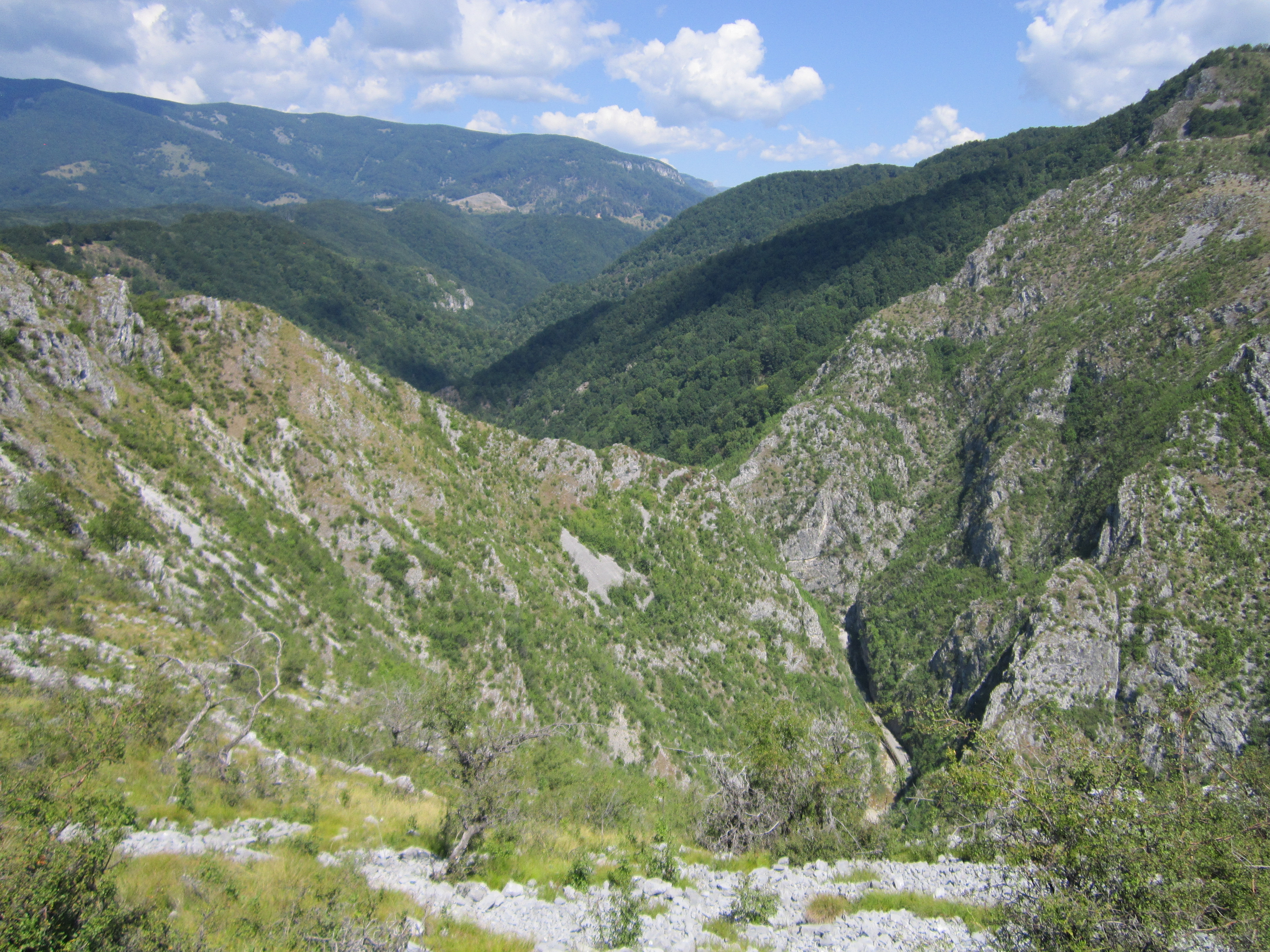
Sohodol Gorge viewed from Cornetu mountain

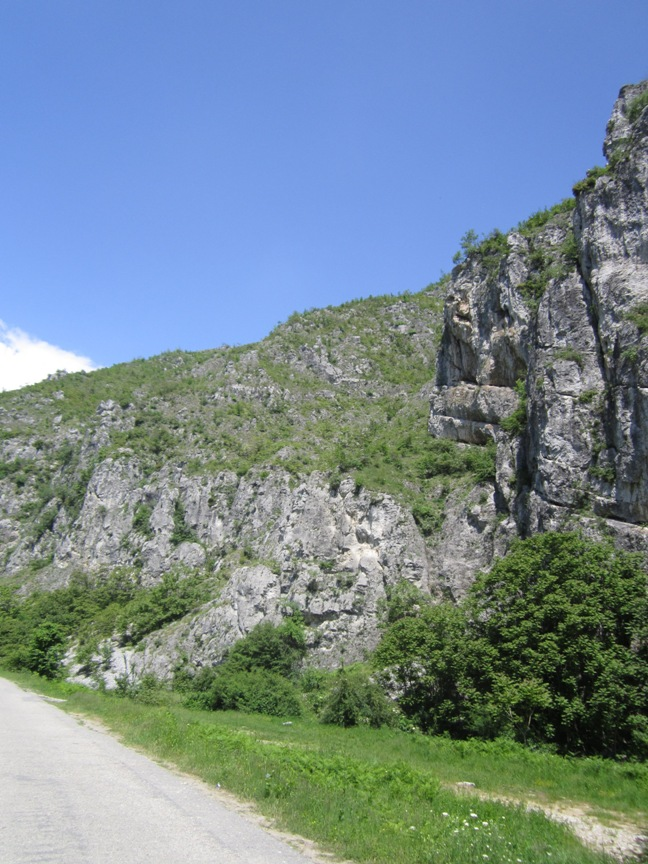
Sohodol Gorge

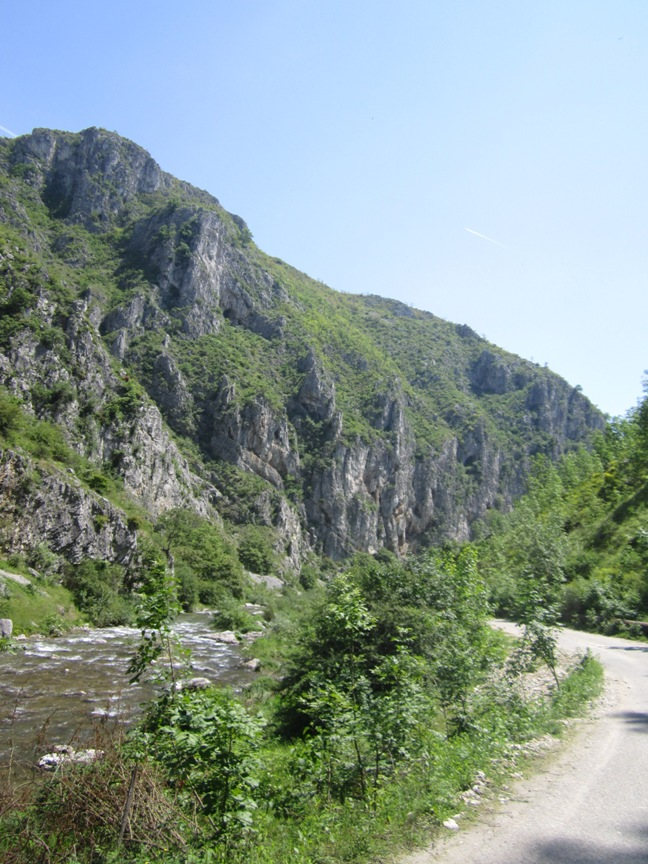
Sohodol Gorge

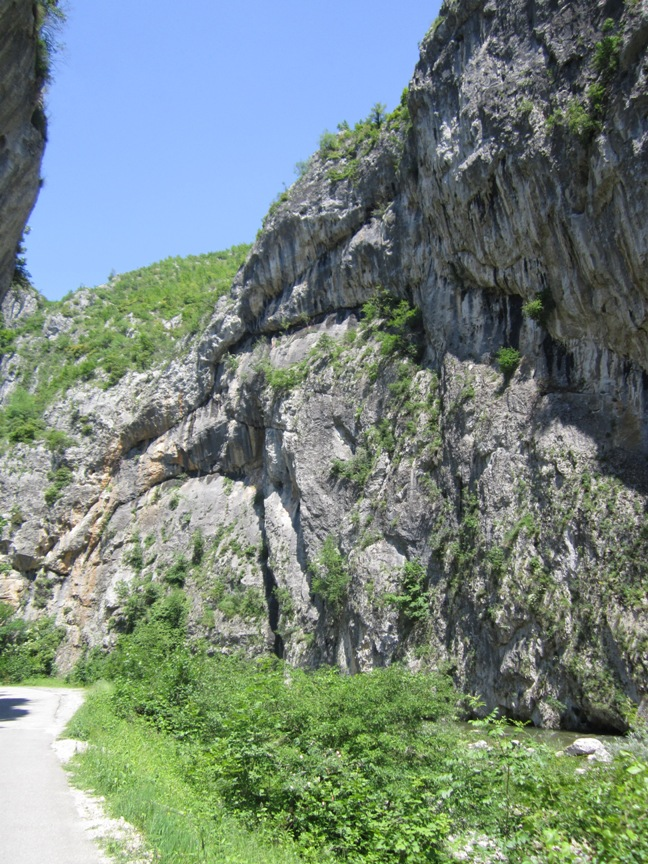
Sohodol Gorge

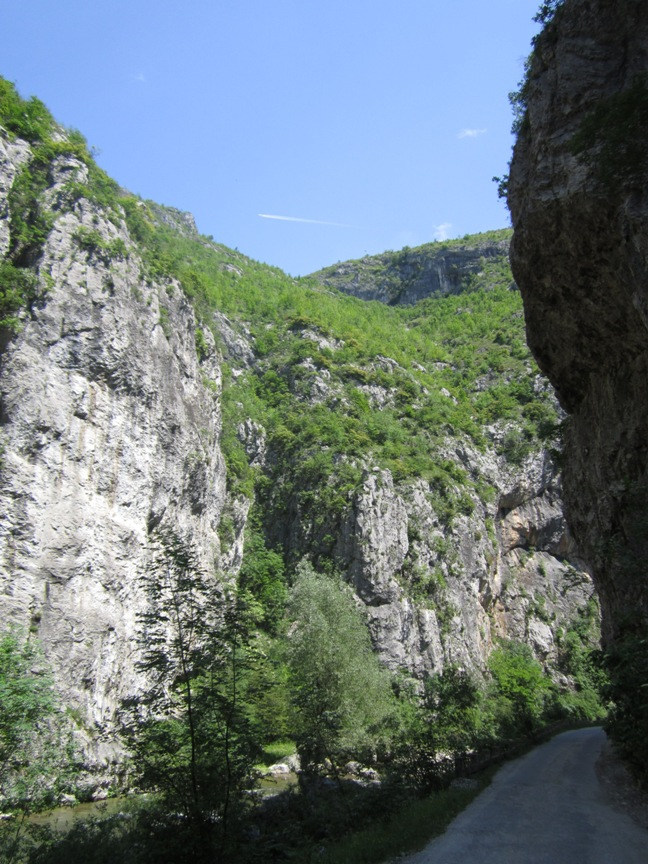
Sohodol Gorge

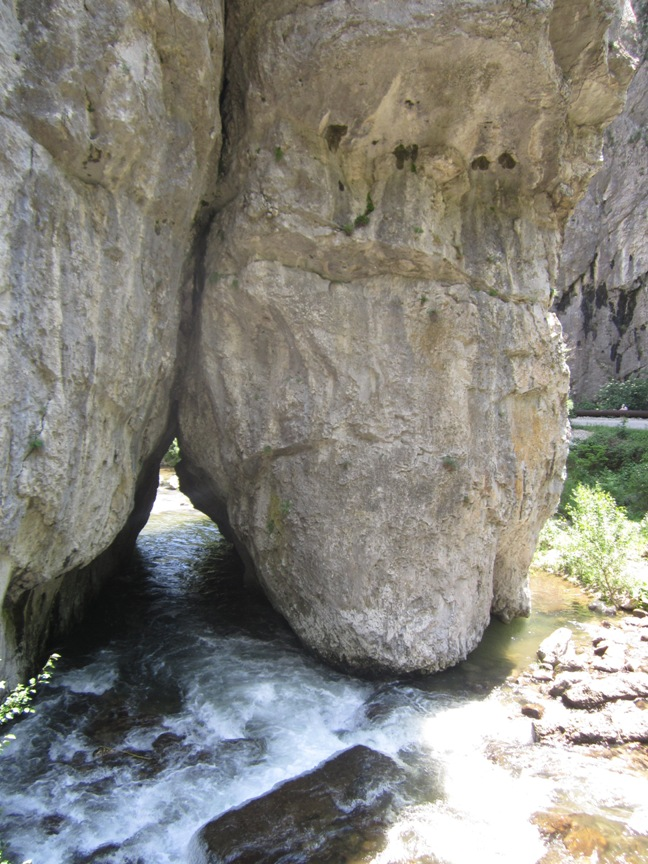
Sohodol Gorge the Oven

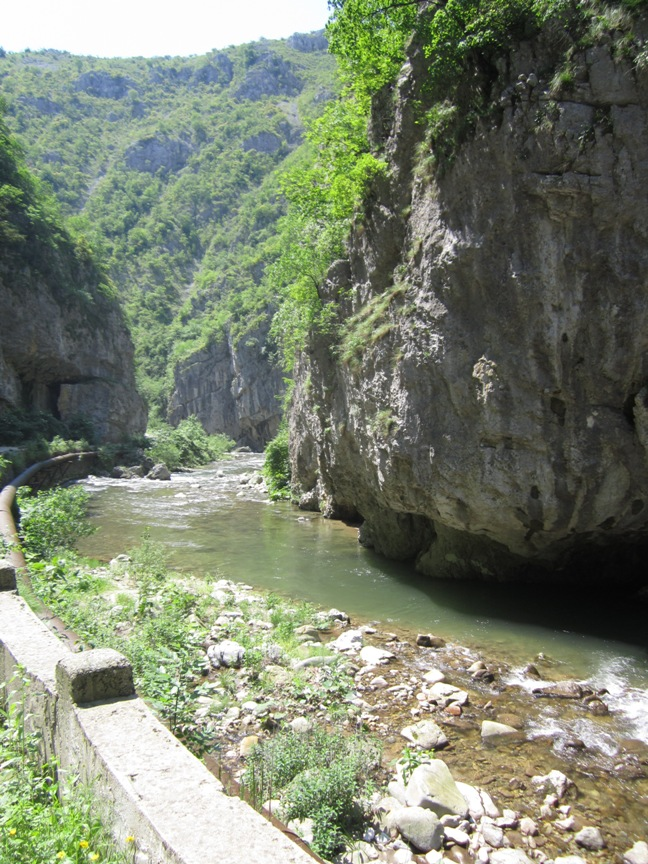
Sohodol Gorge

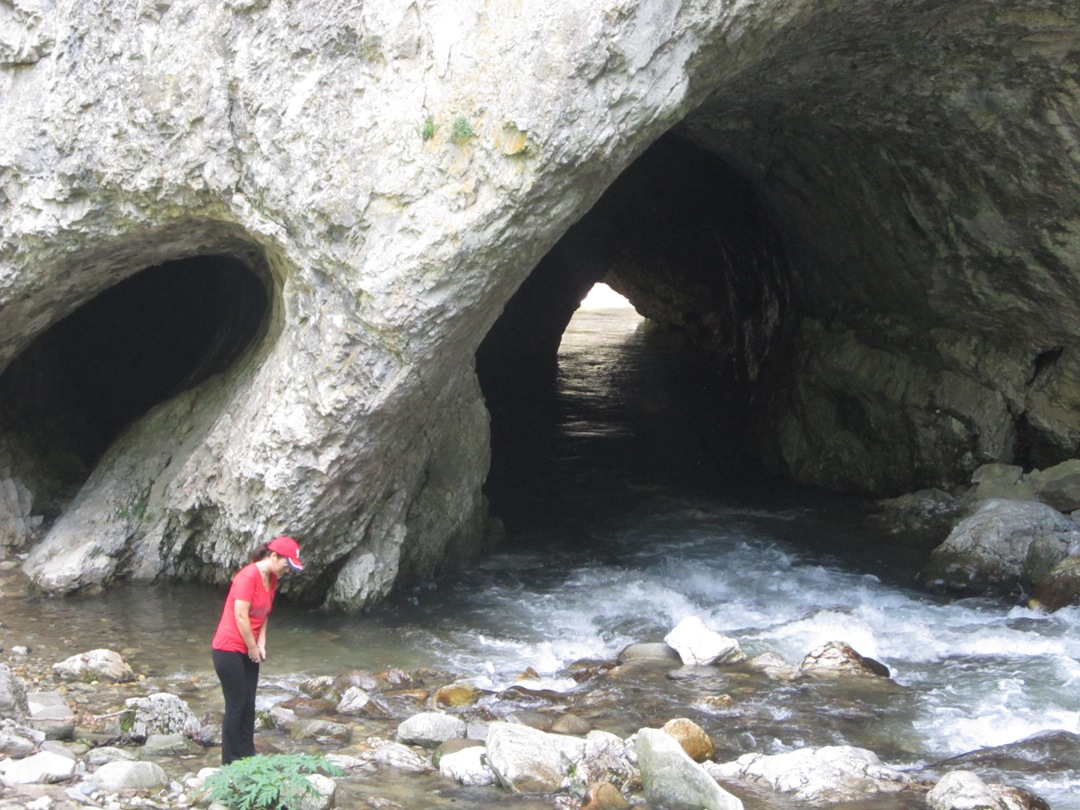
Sohodol Gorge the Nostrils

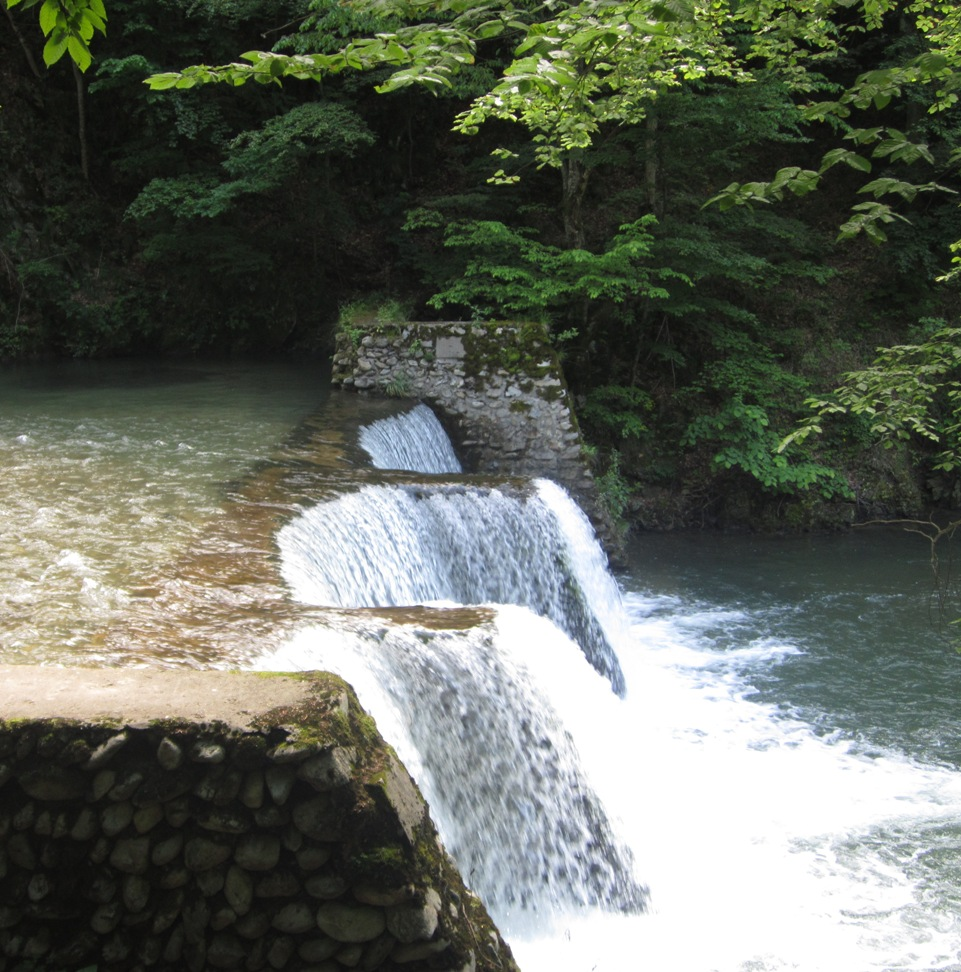
Sohodol Gorge
