= Rasova =

- Rasova, Žabljak, a village in Žabljak Municipality, Montenegro
- Rasova, Constanța, a village and commune in Romania
- Rasova, a village in Bălești, Gorj, Romania
- Rasova (Jaleș), a river in Romania
- Rasova (Danube), a river in Romania, a tributary of the Danube

== See also ==
- Rasovo (disambiguation)
- Razová, a village in the Czech Republic
