= Jaleș =

Jaleș Sohodol
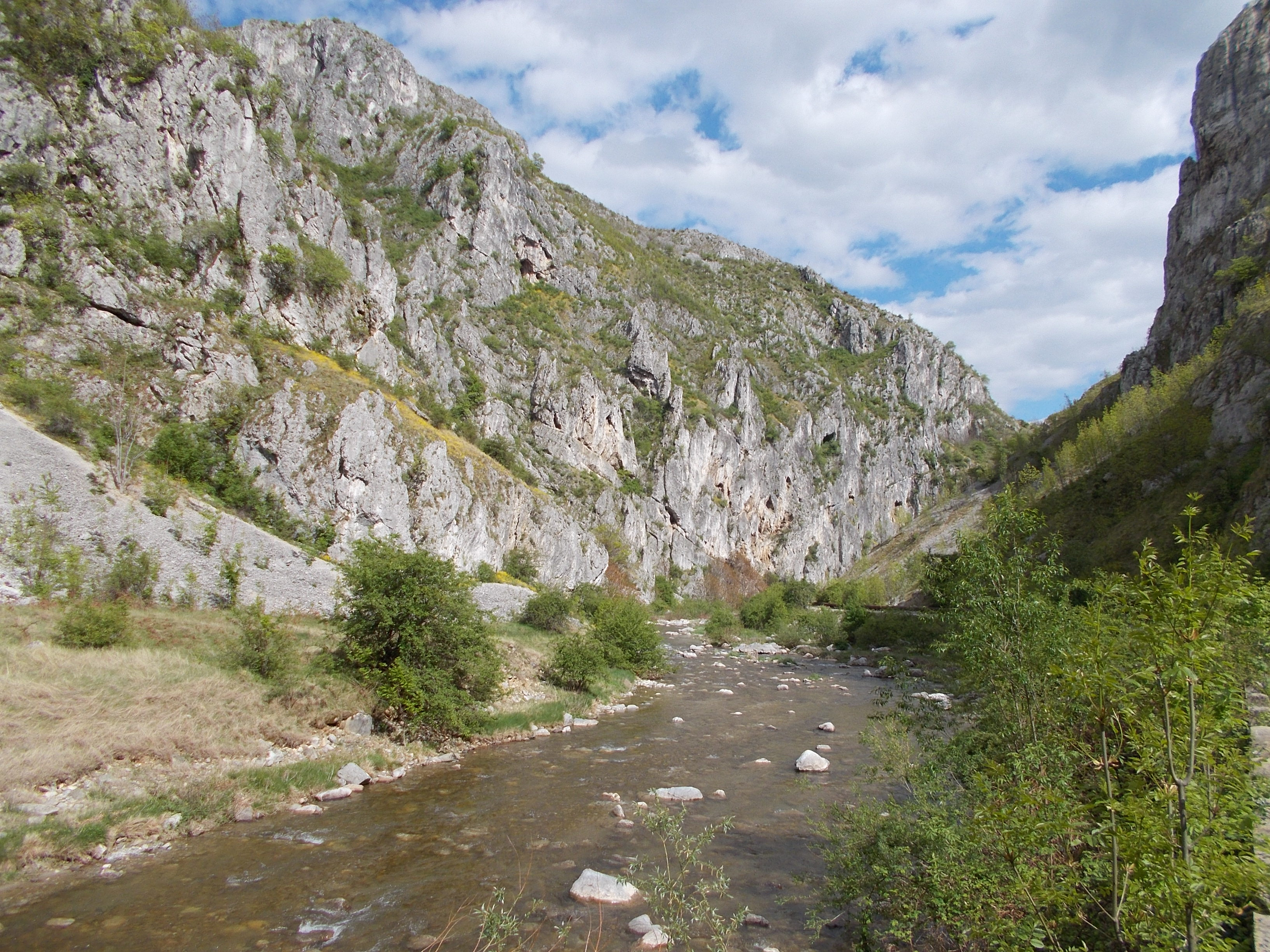

- Location within Romania

Location
- Country: Romania
- Counties: Gorj County
- Villages: Runcu, Răchiți, Stroiești, Stolojani, Tălpășești, Cornești

Physical characteristics
- Mouth: Tismana
  - location: Șomănești
  - coordinates: 44.9602°N 23.1318°E
- Length: 42 km (26 mi)
- Basin size: 242 km^{2} (93 sq mi)

Basin features
- Progression: Tismana→ Jiu→ Danube→ Black Sea
- River code: VII.1.31.7

The Jaleș (also: Sohodol) is a left tributary of the river Tismana in Romania. It flows into the Tismana near Șomănești. Its length is 42 km (26 mi) and its basin size is 242 km^{2} (93 sq mi).

== Tributaries ==
The following rivers are tributaries to the river Jaleș (from source to mouth):

- Left: Cotoru, Pescaru, Șteau, Jeleșel, Cățelu, Podu, Grija, Dragomanu, Prajele, Valea Rea, Vârșioru, Tufoaia, Rasova
- Right: Albele, Turbanu, Pleșu, Fusteica, Plescioara, Căldări, Runc

== See also ==
- Lake Ceauru (project)
