= Șipotele River =

Șipotele River may refer to:

- Șipotele, a tributary of the Izvorul Negru in Bacău County
- Șipotele, a tributary of the Telejenel in Prahova County

== See also ==
- Șipot River (disambiguation)
- Șipotu River (disambiguation)
