= Runcu =

Runcu may refer to several places in Romania:

- Runcu, Dâmbovița, a commune in Dâmbovița County
- Runcu, Gorj, a commune in Gorj County
- Runcu, Vâlcea, a commune in Vâlcea County
- Runcu, a village in Pârscov Commune, Buzău County
- Runcu, a village in Pantelimon Commune, Constanța County
- Runcu, a village in Țibana Commune, Iași County
- Runcu, a village in Dascălu Commune, Ilfov County
- Runcu, a village in Cacica Commune, Suceava County
- Runcu, a district in the town of Buhuși, Bacău County
- Runcu, a tributary of the Lotru in Vâlcea County
- Runcu, a tributary of the Râul Mare in Hunedoara County

== See also ==
- Runc (disambiguation)
