= Runc =

Runc may refer to:

== Places in Romania ==
- Runc, a district in the town of Zlatna, Alba County
- Runc, a village in Ocoliș Commune, Alba County
- Runc, a village in Scărișoara Commune, Alba County
- Runc, a village in Vidra Commune, Alba County
- Runc, a village in Sărmaș Commune, Harghita County
- Runc, an alternative name for the river Govăjdia in Hunedoara County
- Runc, a tributary of the Crișul Pietros in Bihor County
- Runc (Jaleș), a tributary of the Jaleș in Gorj County
- Runc, a tributary of the Mara in Maramureș County
- Runc, a tributary of the Săpânța in Maramureș County
- Runc, a tributary of the Someș in Satu Mare County
- Runc (Someșul Mare), a tributary of the Someșul Mare in Bistrița-Năsăud County

== Computing ==
- runc, a container management tool from Open Container Initiative

== See also ==
- Runcu (disambiguation)
