= Rasova River =

Rasova River may refer to:

- Valea Rasovei, a tributary of the Danube in Constanța County, Romania
- Rasova (Jaleș), a tributary of the Jaleș in Gorj County, Romania
