= Arcani =

Arcani may refer to:

- Arcani, Gorj, a commune in Romania
- Areani, possibly a misspelling of Arcani, Late Roman secret agents in Roman Britain
