= Runc (Jaleș) =

- Location within Romania

Location
- Country: Romania
- Counties: Gorj County
- Villages: Runcu, Sănătești, Arcani

Physical characteristics
- Mouth: Jaleș
  - coordinates: 45.0513°N 23.1447°E
- Length: 9 km (5.6 mi)
- Basin size: 17 km^{2} (6.6 sq mi)

Basin features
- Progression: Jaleș→ Tismana→ Jiu→ Danube→ Black Sea
- River code: VII.1.31.7.3

The Runc is a right tributary of the river Jaleș in Romania. It flows into the Jaleș in Câmpofeni. Its length is 9 km (5.6 mi) and its basin size is 17 km^{2} (6.6 sq mi).
