= Rasova (Jaleș) =

- Location within Romania

Location
- Country: Romania
- Counties: Gorj County
- Villages: Dobrița, Rasovița, Rasova, Ceauru

Physical characteristics
- Mouth: Jaleș
  - coordinates: 44.9854°N 23.1618°E
- Length: 22 km (14 mi)
- Basin size: 51 km^{2} (20 sq mi)

Basin features
- Progression: Jaleș→ Tismana→ Jiu→ Danube→ Black Sea
- River code: VII.1.31.7.4

The Rasova is a left tributary of the river Jaleș in Romania. It flows into the Jaleș near Tămășești. Its length is 22 km (14 mi) and its basin size is 51 km^{2} (20 sq mi).
