= Dlouhá Stráň =

- Municipality
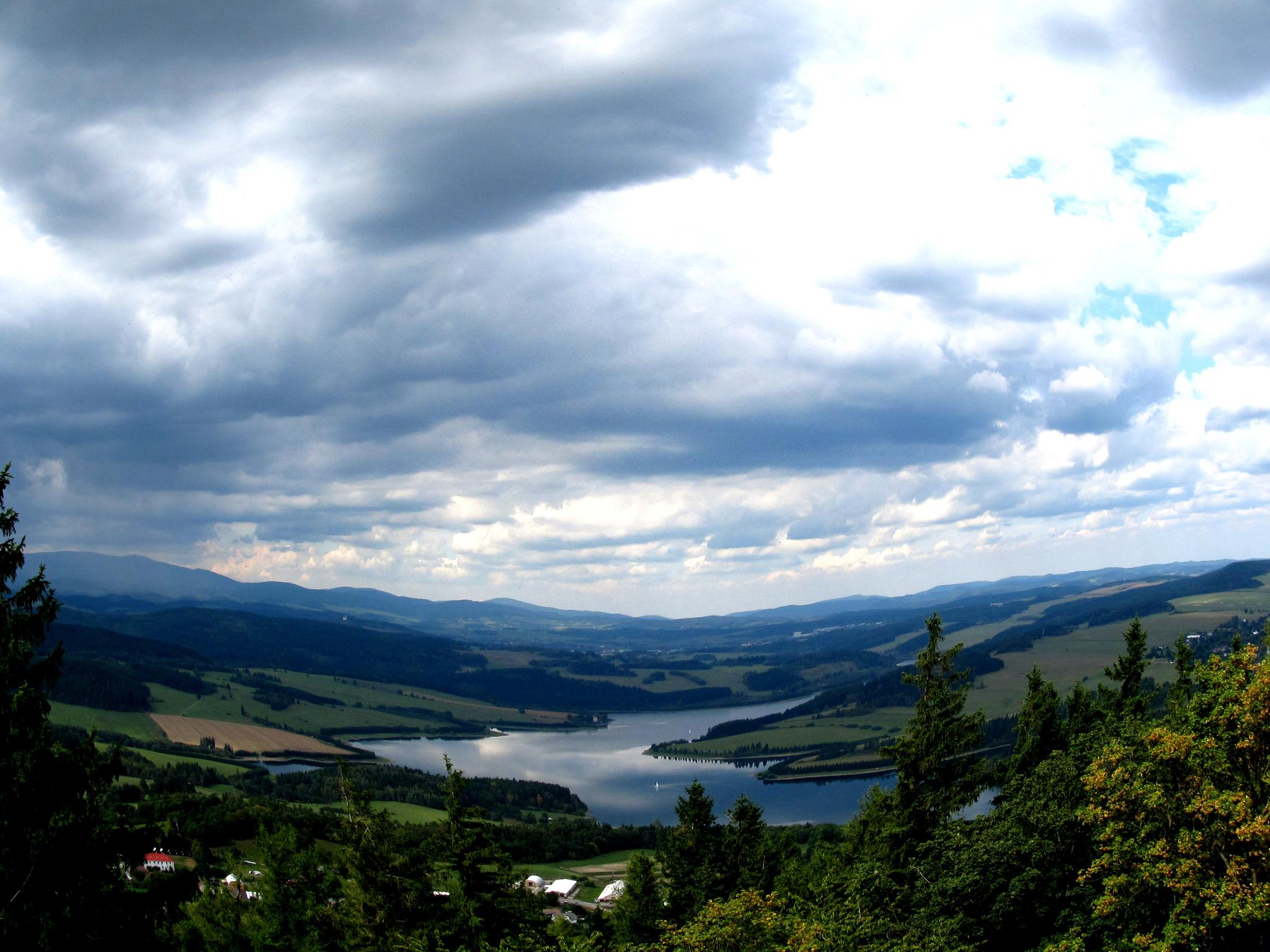
- Dlouhá Stráň on the shore of Slezská Harta

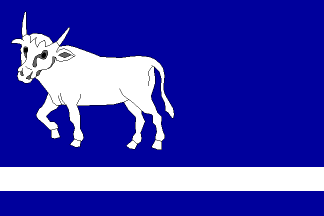
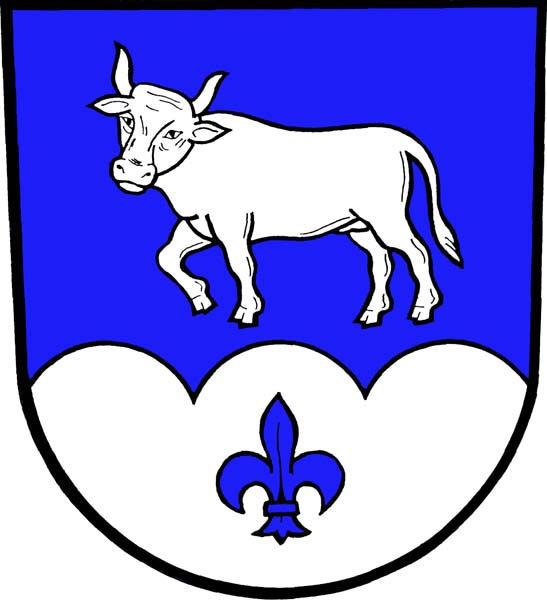
- Flag Coat of arms

- Location in the Czech Republic
- Coordinates: 49°57′36″N 17°30′3″E
- Country: Czech Republic
- Region: Moravian-Silesian
- District: Bruntál
- First mentioned: 1524

Area
  - Total: 2.22 km^{2} (0.86 sq mi)
- Elevation: 517 m (1,696 ft)

Population (2026-01-01)
  - Total: 110
  - Density: 50/km^{2} (130/sq mi)
- Time zone: UTC+1 (CET)
  - Summer (DST): UTC+2 (CEST)
- Postal code: 792 01
- Website: www.dlouhastran.cz

Dlouhá Stráň (German: Langenberg) is a municipality and village in Bruntál District in the Moravian-Silesian Region of the Czech Republic. It has about 100 inhabitants. It lies on the shore of Slezská Harta Reservoir.

== Demographics ==
Historical population
Year	Pop.	±%
1869	329	—
1880	280	−14.9%
1890	278	−0.7%
1900	281	+1.1%
1910	264	−6.0%
1921	241	−8.7%
1930	252	+4.6%
1950	109	−56.7%
1961	112	+2.8%
1970	91	−18.8%
1980	71	−22.0%
1991	47	−33.8%
2001	58	+23.4%
2011	81	+39.7%
2021	83	+2.5%
Source: Censuses
