= Șipot =

Șipot may refer to the following places in Romania:

- Șipot, a village in the commune Pietrari, Dâmbovița County
- Șipot, a tributary of the Crișul Repede in Cluj County
- Șipot, a small river in the city of Brașov

== See also ==
- Șipotu (disambiguation)
- Șipotu River (disambiguation)
- Șipotele River (disambiguation)
