= Nicolae Militaru =

Romanian general and politician (1925–1996)

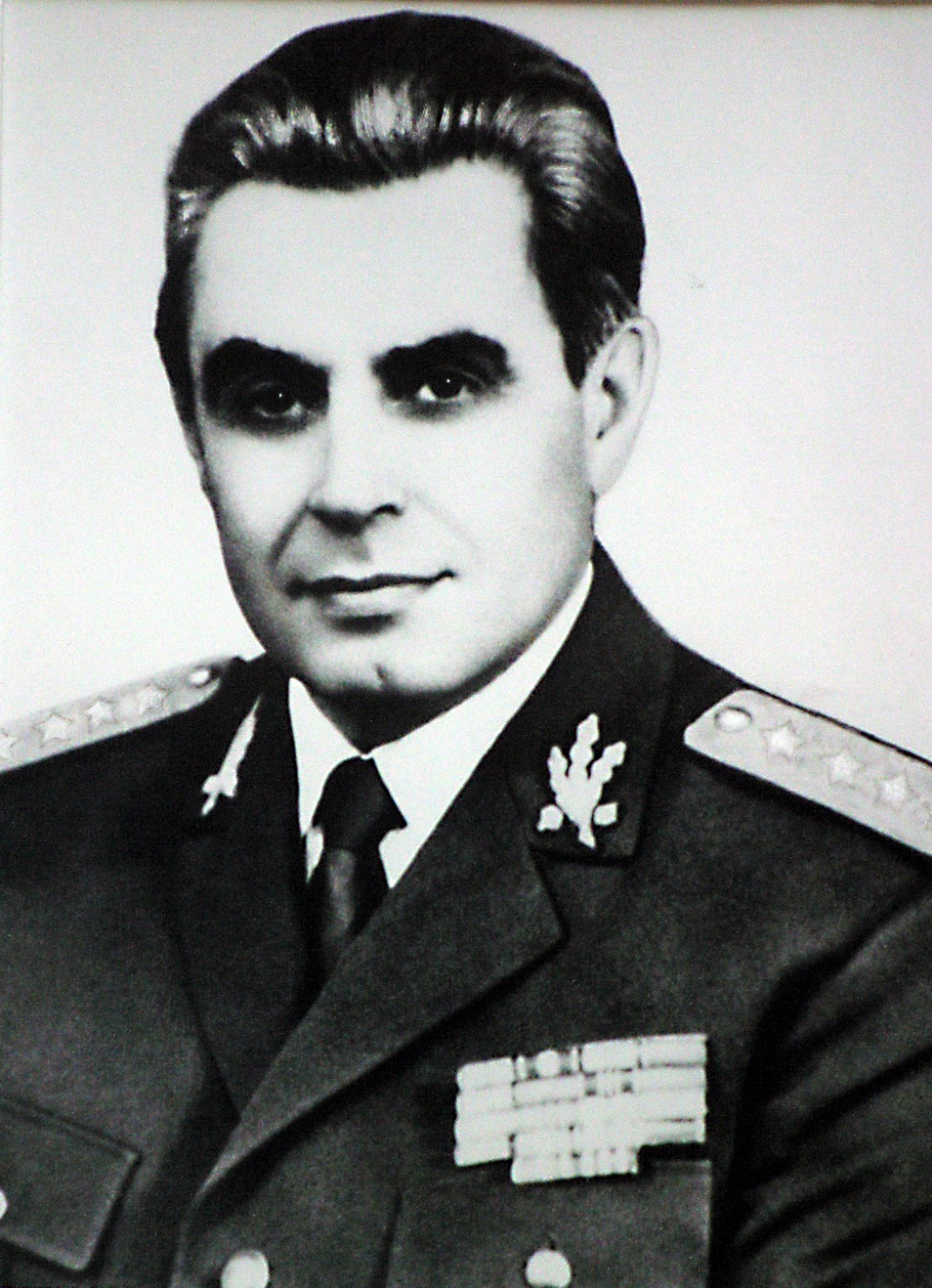

76th Minister of National Defense of Romania
- In office 26 December 1989 – 16 February 1990
- Prime Minister: Petre Roman
- Preceded by: Victor Stănculescu (acting)
- Succeeded by: Victor Stănculescu

Personal details
- Born: 10 November 1925 Bălești, Gorj County, Kingdom of Romania
- Died: 27 December 1996 (aged 71) Bucharest, Romania
- Party: Romanian Communist Party
- Education: Frunze Military Academy
- Profession: Military officer, communist politician

Military service
- Rank: General of the army
- Commands: 3rd Army (1965–1969); 2nd Army (1969–1978)

Nicolae Militaru (10 November 1925 – 27 December 1996) was a Romanian soldier and communist politician. Rising to the rank of general by the 1960s, his ties to the Soviet Union led dictator Nicolae Ceaușescu to question his loyalty and sideline Militaru in 1978. He re-emerged during the Romanian Revolution, when he was made Defense Minister, serving for nearly two months before street pressure forced his dismissal. Days after Ceaușescu’s execution, he was advanced to general of the army. His final public act came in 1996, when Militaru ran for President, barely registering any support.

== Biography ==
=== Under communism ===
Born in Bălești, Gorj County, Militaru joined the Romanian Communist Party (PCR) in 1945, entering the Romanian Land Forces that October. He attended the M. V. Frunze Military Academy in Moscow from 1952 to 1956. Upon graduation, he became a lieutenant colonel in the Romanian Land Forces and was appointed chief of staff of the 10th Infantry Division, stationed in Iași, after which he commanded the 2nd Mechanized Division, stationed in Craiova. Promoted to major general in March 1961, he served as chief of staff of the 3rd Army in Cluj from 1961 to 1965. From 1965 to 1969, he served as commanding officer of the 3rd Army. He then commanded the 2nd Army (headquartered in Bucharest) from 1969 to 1978, attaining the rank of colonel general in 1974. He sat on the PCR’s central committee as an alternate member from 1974 to 1984. From 1969 to 1975, he represented Gurahonț, Arad County in the Great National Assembly.

In 1978, under suspicion for being a GRU agent and for plotting against dictator Nicolae Ceaușescu, he was retired from active duty and made an assistant to the Industrial Constructions Minister, remaining until 1984. A Securitate plot to depose Ceaușescu existed in the early 1980s, and he is known to have joined in 1984, adding an Army dimension. Following the rise of Mikhail Gorbachev in 1985, Militaru requested the Soviet leader's backing for an anti-Ceaușescu coup d'état; this was rejected.

=== Revolution and aftermath ===
On 24 December 1989, during the Romanian Revolution, Militaru was already in charge of the heavily guarded Defense Ministry when a controversial incident took place. According to a narrative put forward by former Securitate agents, he lured USLA military counterintelligence agents into an ambush and ensured the group was headed by Colonel Gheorghe Trosca and Major Eugen Cotuna since they had compromising information on Militaru's alleged GRU ties; the pair ended up killed. However, during 1990, army officers in the military's own press cast doubt on a story that was widely reported in civilian newspapers, alleging it was a Securitate diversion effectively spread by agents who had infiltrated the regular press.

On 26 December, in the Revolution's immediate aftermath, the new leader, Ion Iliescu, formally named him Defense Minister. Two days later, Iliescu issued a decree promoting Militaru to the rank of general of the army. As minister, Militaru recalled to active duty some thirty officers, most of whom had received active training in the Soviet Union. Other officers became increasingly uneasy and a pro-reform group, Comitetul de Acțiune pentru Democratizarea Armatei (CADA, Action Committee for the Democratization of the Army) emerged on 12 February 1990. The following day over a thousand soldiers and officers assembled in Bucharest, and Militaru was dismissed on 16 February, replaced by General Victor Stănculescu. He ran in the 1996 presidential election, winning 0.22% of the vote but died of cancer the following month.

== Electoral history ==
=== Presidential elections ===
Election	Affiliation	First round			Second round		
Election	Affiliation	Votes	Percentage	Position	Votes	Percentage	Position
1996	Independent	28,318	0.2%	16th			
