= Slezská Harta Reservoir =

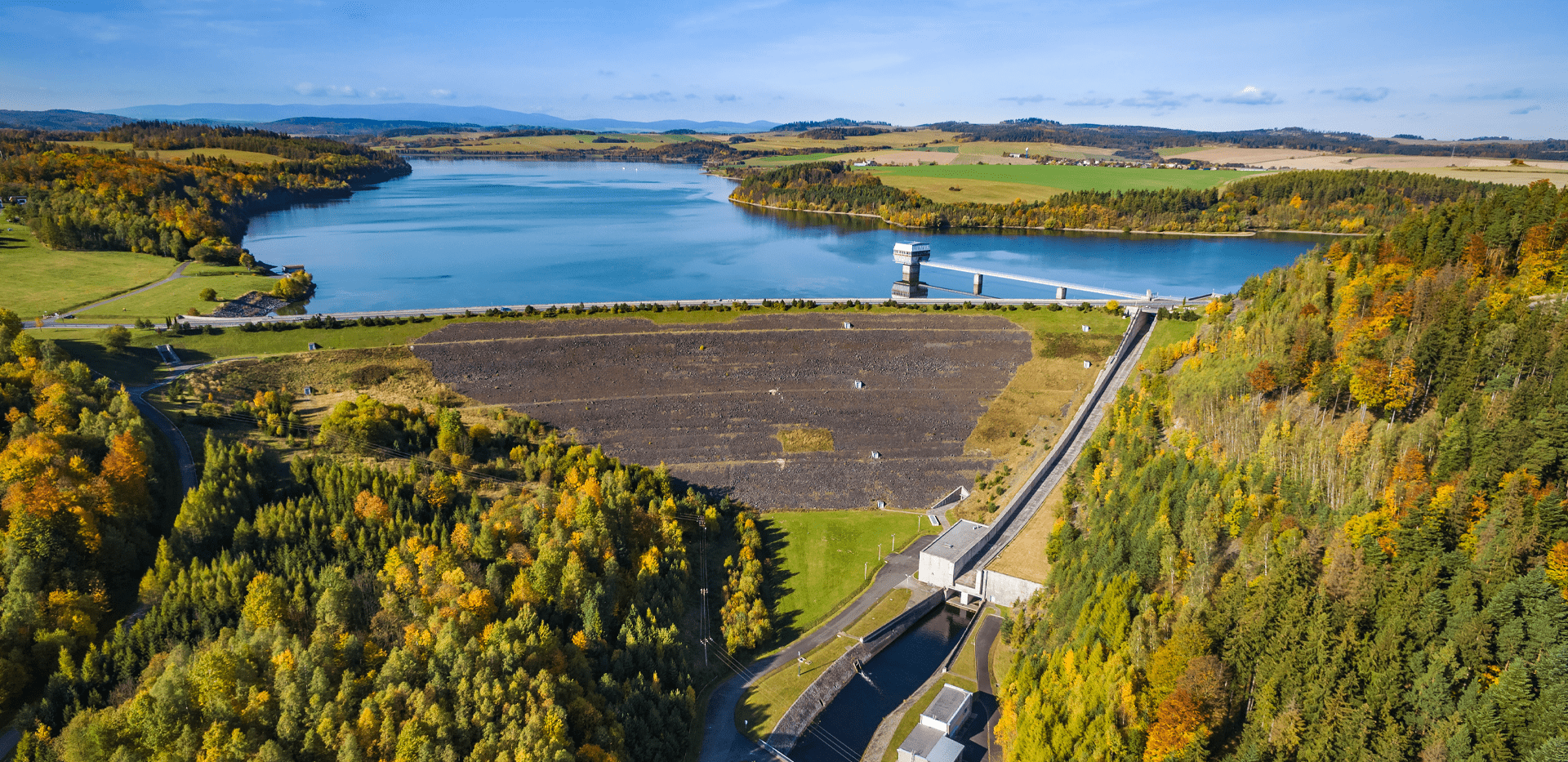
- The 65 metres (213 ft) tall embankment dam of Slezská Harta

- Location within Czech Republic
- Coordinates: 49°53′25″N 17°34′53″E
- Type: reservoir
- Primary inflows: Moravice
- Primary outflows: Moravice
- Catchment area: 464.1 km^{2} (179.2 sq mi)
- Basin countries: Czech Republic
- Max. length: 135 km (84 mi)
- Max. width: 1.7 km (1.1 mi)
- Surface area: 8.7 km^{2} (3.4 sq mi)
- Max. depth: 62 m (203 ft)
- Water volume: 218.7×10^{6} m^{3} (177,300 acre⋅ft)
- Surface elevation: 500 m (1,600 ft)
- Settlements: Bruntál

Slezská Harta Reservoir (Czech: Vodní nádrž Slezská Harta) is an artificial reservoir and a rock-fill embankment dam in the Nízký Jeseník mountain range, Moravian-Silesian Region, Czech Republic. The dam is built on the upper course of the Moravice River. With the surface area of 8.7 km^{2}, it is one of the largest reservoirs in the country. It was constructed in 1987–1997.

During the construction parts of six villages were demolished and subsequently flooded. The village of Karlovec was completely flooded and ceased to exist. Today only Church of Saint John of Nepomuk and several other abandoned buildings remain at the reservoir's shore. Villages of Dlouhá Stráň, Nová Pláň, Razová, Roudno and Leskovec nad Moravicí were also partially flooded and are today located on the shore of the reservoir.

The main use of the reservoir is to supply enough water in case of unfavorable conditions to the Kružberk reservoir, which supplies drinking water for the Ostrava agglomeration, and is located downstream on the Moravice River. It is also used to supply process water to the nearby towns and villages, generate electricity and subdue floods on the Moravice.
