= Roudno =

- Municipality
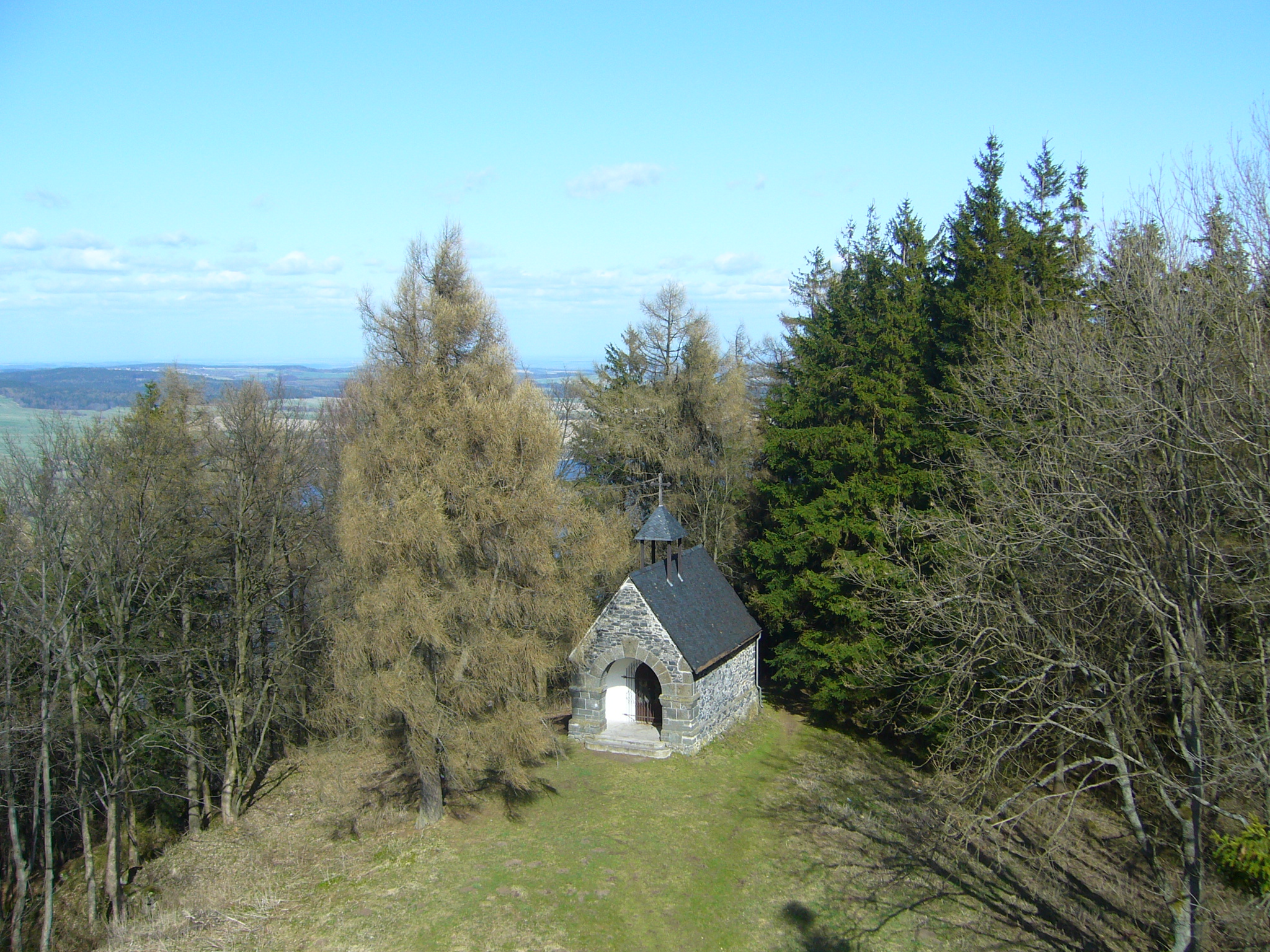
- Chapel of Saints Peter and Paul

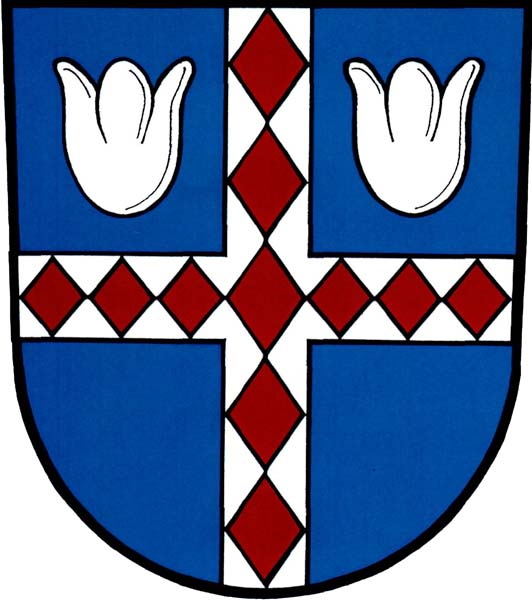
- Flag Coat of arms

- Location in the Czech Republic
- Coordinates: 49°53′46″N 17°30′49″E
- Country: Czech Republic
- Region: Moravian-Silesian
- District: Bruntál
- First mentioned: 1397

Area
  - Total: 22.20 km^{2} (8.57 sq mi)
- Elevation: 577 m (1,893 ft)

Population (2026-01-01)
  - Total: 212
  - Density: 9.55/km^{2} (24.7/sq mi)
- Time zone: UTC+1 (CET)
  - Summer (DST): UTC+2 (CEST)
- Postal code: 792 01
- Website: www.obecroudno.cz

Roudno (German: Rautenberg) is a municipality and village in Bruntál District in the Moravian-Silesian Region of the Czech Republic. It has about 200 inhabitants. It lies on the shore of Slezská Harta Reservoir.

== Administrative division ==
Roudno consists of two municipal parts (in brackets population according to the 2021 census):

- Roudno (176)
- Volárna (19)

== Demographics ==
Historical population
Year	Pop.	±%
1869	1,232	—
1880	1,139	−7.5%
1890	1,013	−11.1%
1900	996	−1.7%
1910	943	−5.3%
1921	846	−10.3%
1930	809	−4.4%
1950	439	−45.7%
1961	463	+5.5%
1970	429	−7.3%
1980	352	−17.9%
1991	223	−36.6%
2001	204	−8.5%
2011	187	−8.3%
2021	195	+4.3%
Source: Censuses
