= Nová Pláň =

- Municipality
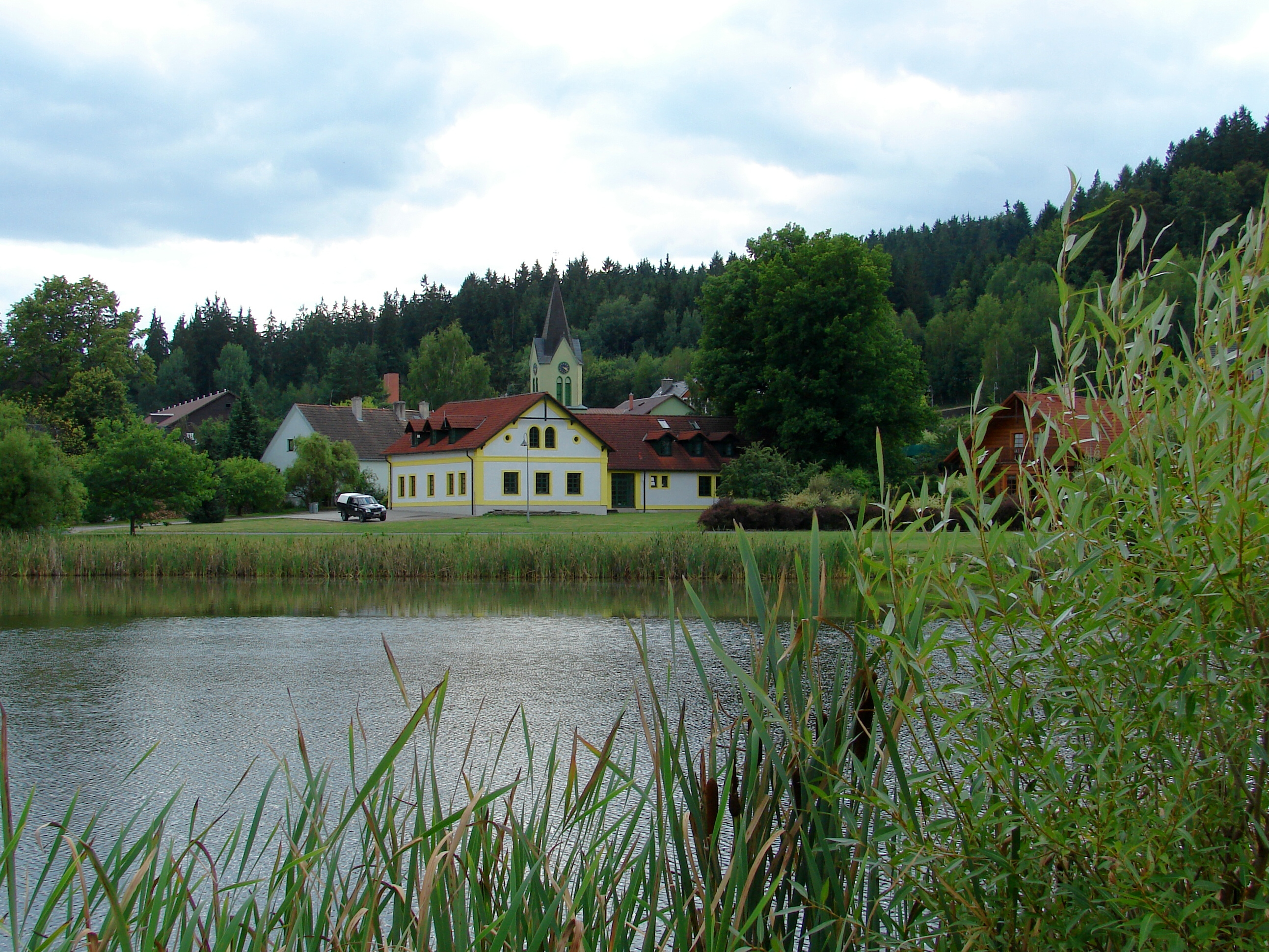
- View over the reservoir

- Flag Coat of arms

- Location in the Czech Republic
- Coordinates: 49°55′19″N 17°28′31″E
- Country: Czech Republic
- Region: Moravian-Silesian
- District: Bruntál
- First mentioned: 1680

Area
  - Total: 1.72 km^{2} (0.66 sq mi)
- Elevation: 494 m (1,621 ft)

Population (2026-01-01)
  - Total: 56
  - Density: 33/km^{2} (84/sq mi)
- Time zone: UTC+1 (CET)
  - Summer (DST): UTC+2 (CEST)
- Postal code: 792 01
- Website: www.novaplan.cz

Nová Pláň (German: Neurode) is a municipality and village in Bruntál District in the Moravian-Silesian Region of the Czech Republic. It has about 60 inhabitants. It lies on the shore of Slezská Harta Reservoir.

== Demographics ==
Historical population
Year	Pop.	±%
1869	272	—
1880	229	−15.8%
1890	276	+20.5%
1900	279	+1.1%
1910	292	+4.7%
1921	249	−14.7%
1930	261	+4.8%
1950	186	−28.7%
1961	193	+3.8%
1970	168	−13.0%
1980	124	−26.2%
1991	29	−76.6%
2001	26	−10.3%
2011	52	+100.0%
2021	58	+11.5%
Source: Censuses
