= Rasovo =

Rasovo may refer to:

- Rasovo, Montana Province, a village in northern Bulgaria
- Rasovo, Kyustendil Province, a village in southern Bulgaria
- Rasovo, Montenegro, a village in Montenegro

== See also ==
- Rasova (disambiguation)
