= Șipotu =

Șipotu may refer to several entities in Romania:

- Șipotu, a village in Turburea Commune, Gorj County
- Șipotu, a village in Ponoarele Commune, Mehedinți County
- Șipotu, a village in Poroina Mare Commune, Mehedinți County
- Șipotu, a village in Lipănești Commune, Prahova County
- Șipotu, a name for the upper course of the Plescioara in Gorj County
- Șipotu, a tributary of the Putna in Vrancea County
- Șipotu, a tributary of the Râul Mare in Hunedoara County

== See also ==
- Șipot (disambiguation)
