= Leskovec nad Moravicí =

- Municipality
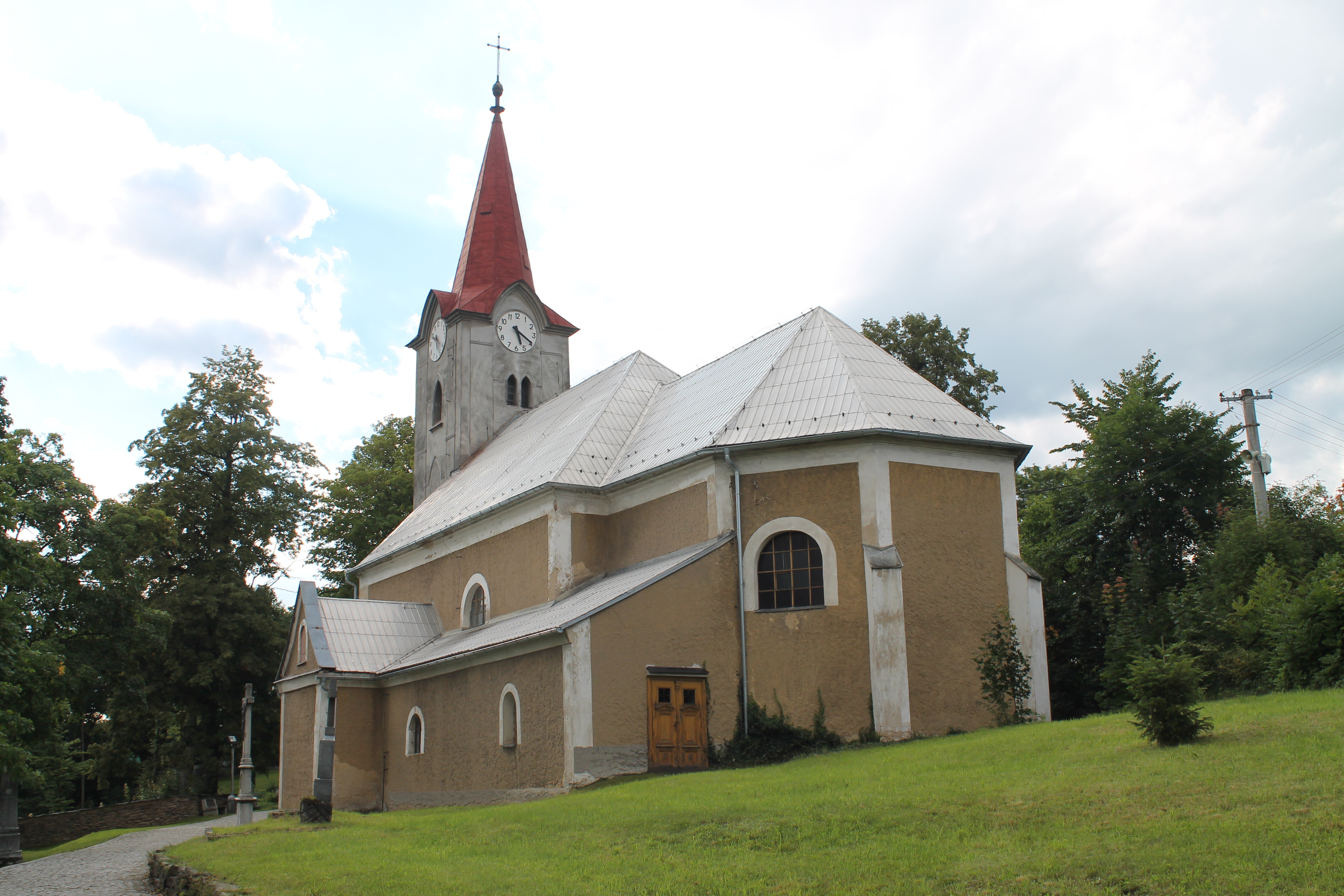
- Church of Saint Lawrence

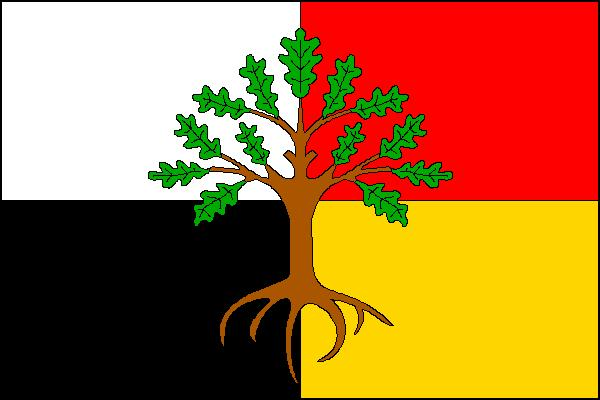
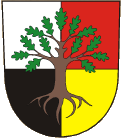
- Flag Coat of arms

- Location in the Czech Republic
- Coordinates: 49°54′21″N 17°34′29″E
- Country: Czech Republic
- Region: Moravian-Silesian
- District: Bruntál
- Founded: 1224

Area
  - Total: 15.62 km^{2} (6.03 sq mi)
- Elevation: 510 m (1,670 ft)

Population (2026-01-01)
  - Total: 438
  - Density: 28.0/km^{2} (72.6/sq mi)
- Time zone: UTC+1 (CET)
  - Summer (DST): UTC+2 (CEST)
- Postal code: 793 68
- Website: www.leskovecnadmoravici.eu

Leskovec nad Moravicí (formerly also Špachov; German: Spachendorf) is a municipality and village in Bruntál District in the Moravian-Silesian Region of the Czech Republic. It has about 400 inhabitants. It lies on the shore of Slezská Harta Reservoir.

== Administrative division ==
Leskovec nad Moravicí consists of two municipal parts (in brackets population according to the 2021 census):

- Leskovec nad Moravicí (368)
- Slezská Harta (9)

== History ==
The village of Leskovec was founded in 1224.

== Demographics ==
Historical population
Year	Pop.	±%
1869	2,039	—
1880	1,855	−9.0%
1890	1,685	−9.2%
1900	1,786	+6.0%
1910	1,791	+0.3%
1921	1,499	−16.3%
1930	1,537	+2.5%
1950	810	−47.3%
1961	1,010	+24.7%
1970	961	−4.9%
1980	855	−11.0%
1991	512	−40.1%
2001	522	+2.0%
2011	419	−19.7%
2021	377	−10.0%
Source: Censuses
