= Plescioara =

- Location within Romania

Location
- Country: Romania
- Counties: Gorj County

Physical characteristics
- Source: Vâlcan Mountains
- Mouth: Jaleș
  - coordinates: 45.1893°N 23.1333°E
- Length: 9 km (5.6 mi)
- Basin size: 36 km^{2} (14 sq mi)

Basin features
- Progression: Jaleș→ Tismana→ Jiu→ Danube→ Black Sea
- Tributaries
  - left: Piva
  - right: Sărăturii
- River code: VII.1.31.7.2

The Plescioara (in its upper course also Șipotu) is a right tributary of the river Jaleș in Romania. Its source is in the Vâlcan Mountains. It flows into the Jaleș upstream from the Sohodol Gorge. Its length is 9 km (5.6 mi) and its basin size is 36 km^{2} (14 sq mi).
