= Razová =

- Municipality
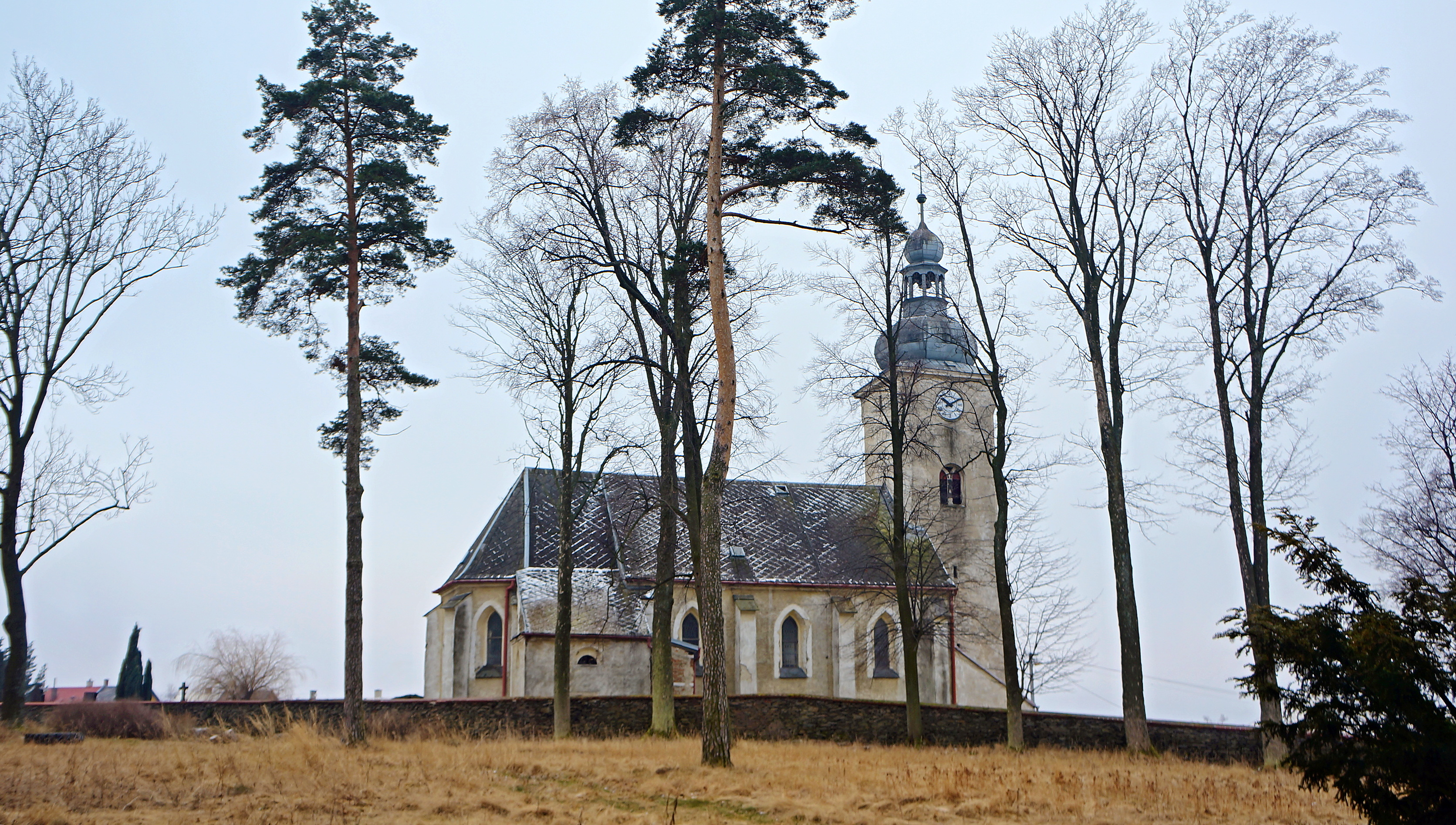
- Church of Saint Michael

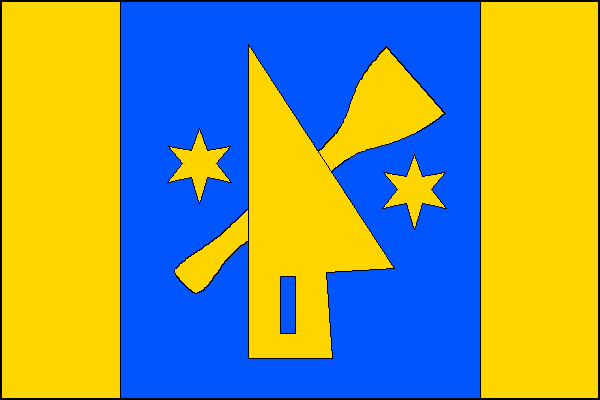
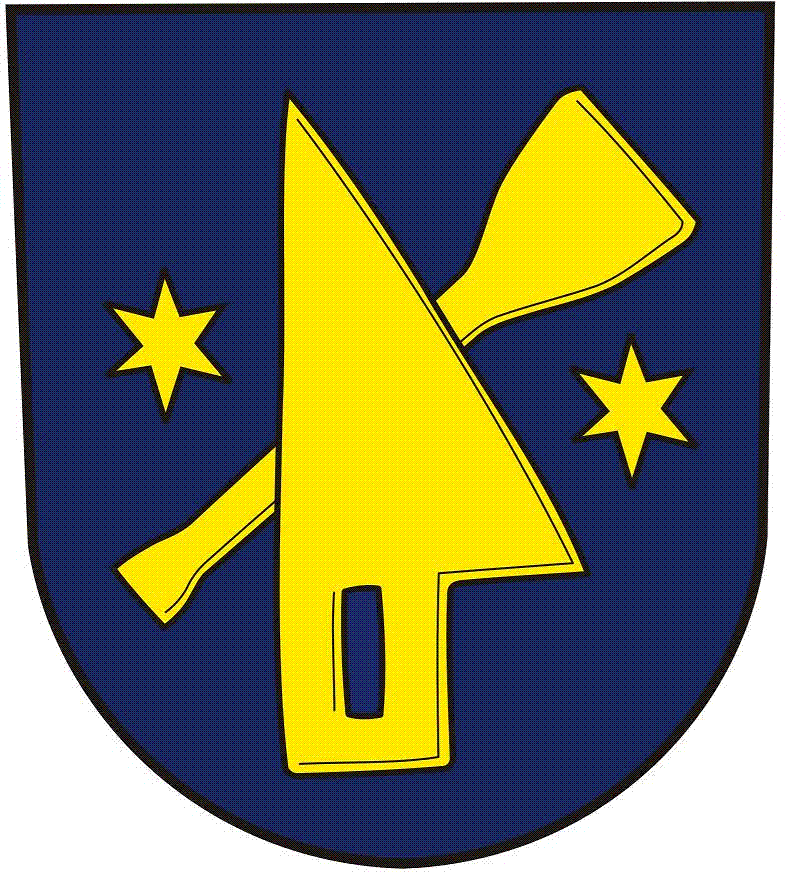
- Flag Coat of arms

- Location in the Czech Republic
- Coordinates: 49°55′53″N 17°31′55″E
- Country: Czech Republic
- Region: Moravian-Silesian
- District: Bruntál
- First mentioned: 1288

Area
  - Total: 31.93 km^{2} (12.33 sq mi)
- Elevation: 555 m (1,821 ft)

Population (2026-01-01)
  - Total: 509
  - Density: 15.9/km^{2} (41.3/sq mi)
- Time zone: UTC+1 (CET)
  - Summer (DST): UTC+2 (CEST)
- Postal code: 792 01
- Website: www.razova.cz

Razová (German: Raase) is a municipality and village in Bruntál District in the Moravian-Silesian Region of the Czech Republic. It has about 500 inhabitants. It lies on the shore of Slezská Harta Reservoir.

== History ==
The first written mention of Razová is from 1288.

== Demographics ==
Historical population
Year	Pop.	±%
1869	2,173	—
1880	2,094	−3.6%
1890	2,061	−1.6%
1900	1,966	−4.6%
1910	1,839	−6.5%
1921	1,637	−11.0%
1930	1,670	+2.0%
1950	758	−54.6%
1961	768	+1.3%
1970	722	−6.0%
1980	672	−6.9%
1991	514	−23.5%
2001	535	+4.1%
2011	515	−3.7%
2021	476	−7.6%
Source: Censuses
