= Runcu, Gorj =

Runcu
- Commune
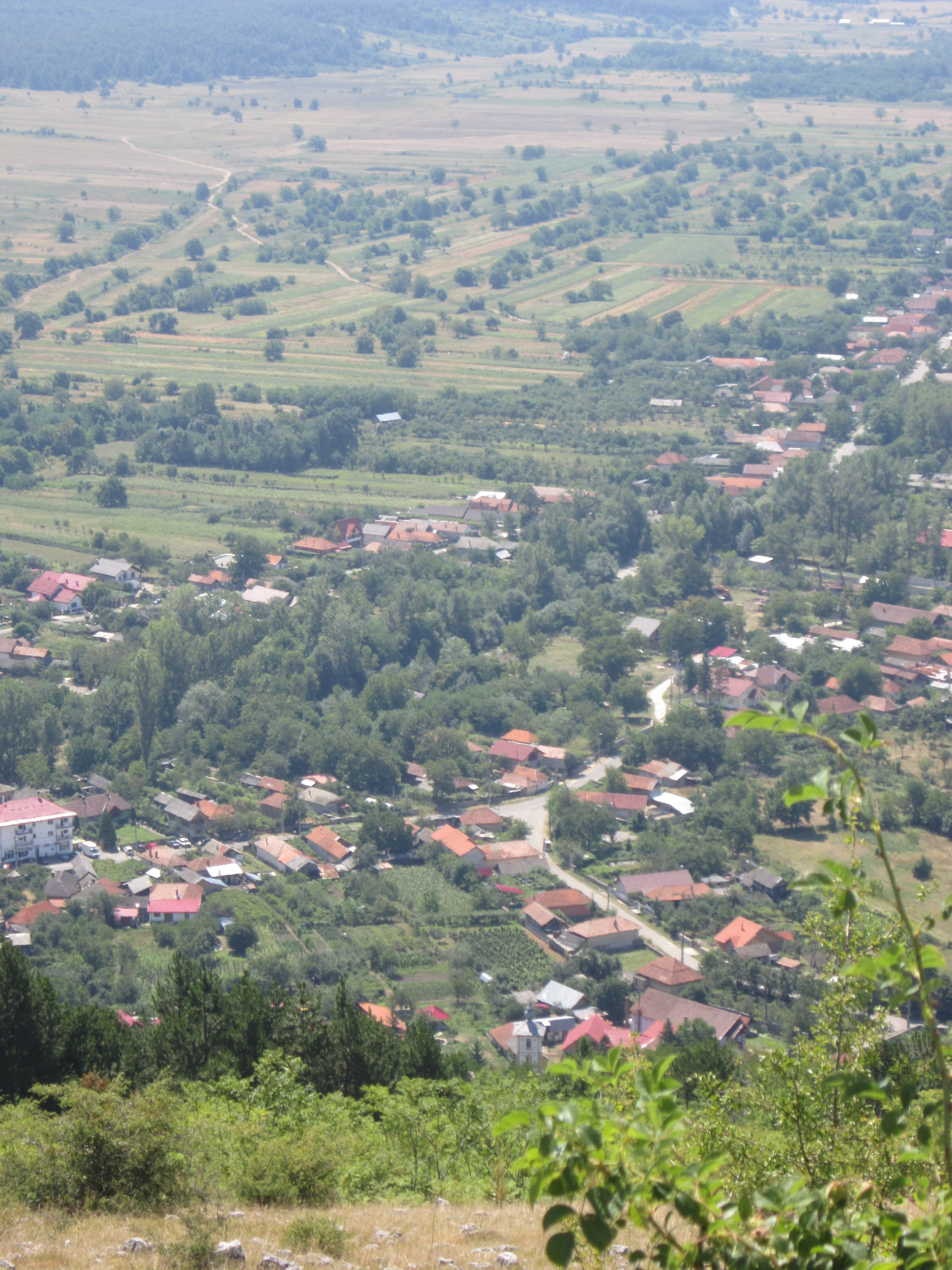
- Runcu seen from atop of Cornetul Mountain

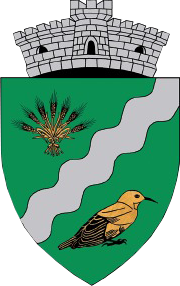
- Coat of arms

- Location in Romania
- Coordinates: 45°07′N 23°08′E
- Country: Romania
- County: Gorj
- Subdivisions: Bâlta, Bâltișoara, Dobrița, Răchiți, Runcu, Suseni, Valea Mare

Government
  - Mayor (2020–2024): Grigore-Adi Câmpeanu (PSD)
- Area: 272.2 km^{2} (105.1 sq mi)
- Elevation: 289 m (948 ft)
- Population (2021-12-01): 5,324
  - Density: 19.56/km^{2} (50.66/sq mi)
- Time zone: UTC+02:00 (EET)
  - Summer (DST): UTC+03:00 (EEST)
- Postal code: 217390
- Area code: +(40) 253
- Vehicle reg.: GJ
- Website: runcugorj.ro

Runcu is a commune in Gorj County, Oltenia, Romania. It is situated at the foot of the Vâlcan Mountains, 16 km (10 mi) northwest of Târgu Jiu. The commune is composed of seven villages: Bâlta, Bâltișoara, Dobrița, Răchiți, Runcu, Suseni, and Valea Mare.

The name Runcu derives from medio-Latin "runcari" which means to deforest. A village on the Jaleș River named Dăbăcești (now disappeared) mentioned in a document of Dan I dated 3 Octombrie 1385 was the precursor of Runcu. Runcu village was first mentioned in a document issued in 1486 by Vlad Călugărul. The dominant class of Wallachia maintained interests in the area during most of the Middle Ages. According to some sources, the local church was founded in the early 17th century by Domnița Florica, daughter of Michael the Brave, who sought refuge in Runcu after the death of her father.

Stone and Bronze Age archaeological finds, as well as artifacts from before the Roman conquest, indicate that Runcu and the surrounding areas were inhabited much earlier.

Runcu is the birthplace of folk music singers Ioana Zlătaru and Maria Apostol (1954–1993).

Scenes from the Romanian films Bătălia din umbră (1986), Iancu Jianu, haiducul (1981), Iancu Jianu, zapciul (1980) and Ecaterina Teodoroiu (1979) were shot in Runcu village and on the nearby Sohodol Gorge.

== Photo gallery ==
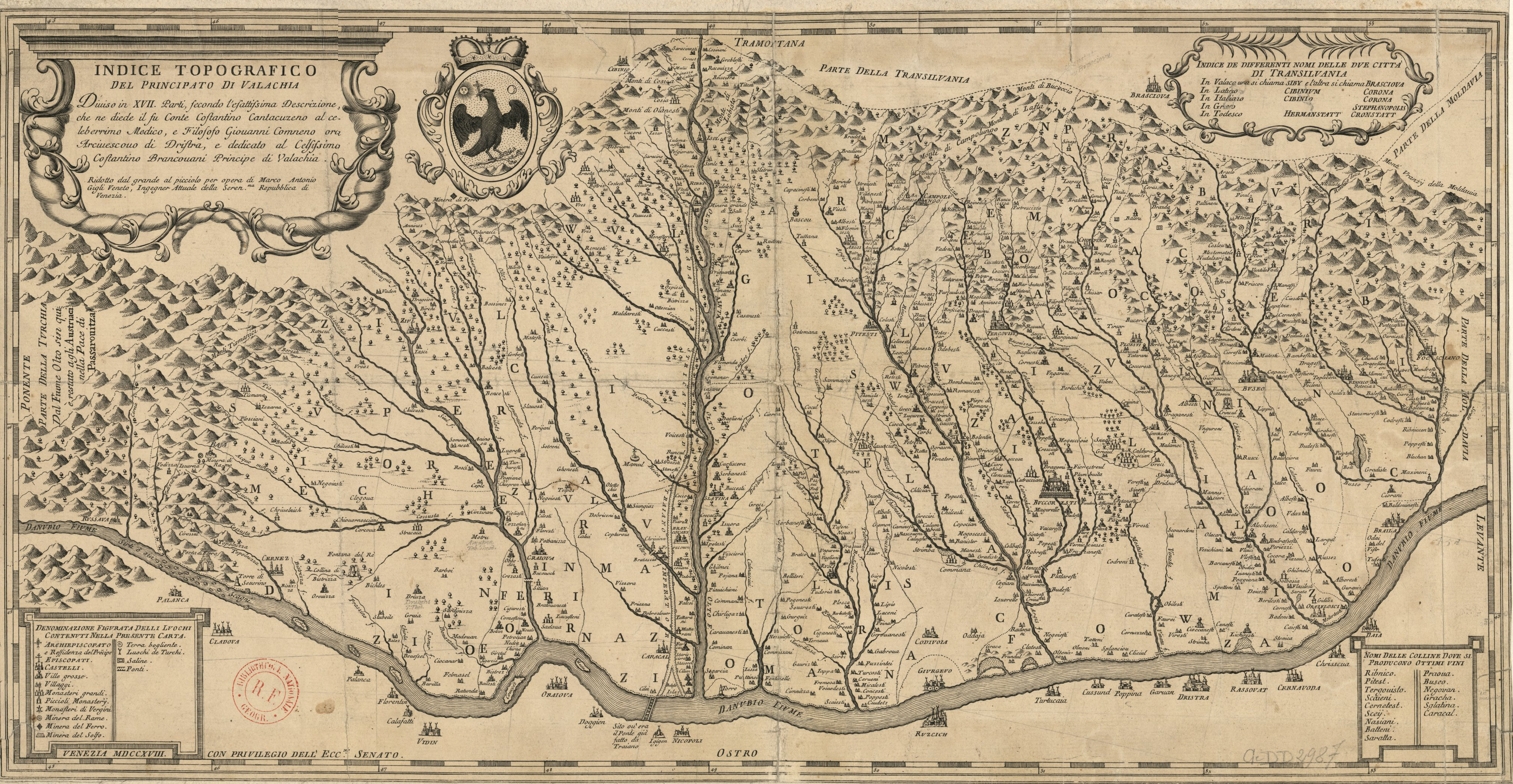
Runcu and the Jaleș River on a 1717 map

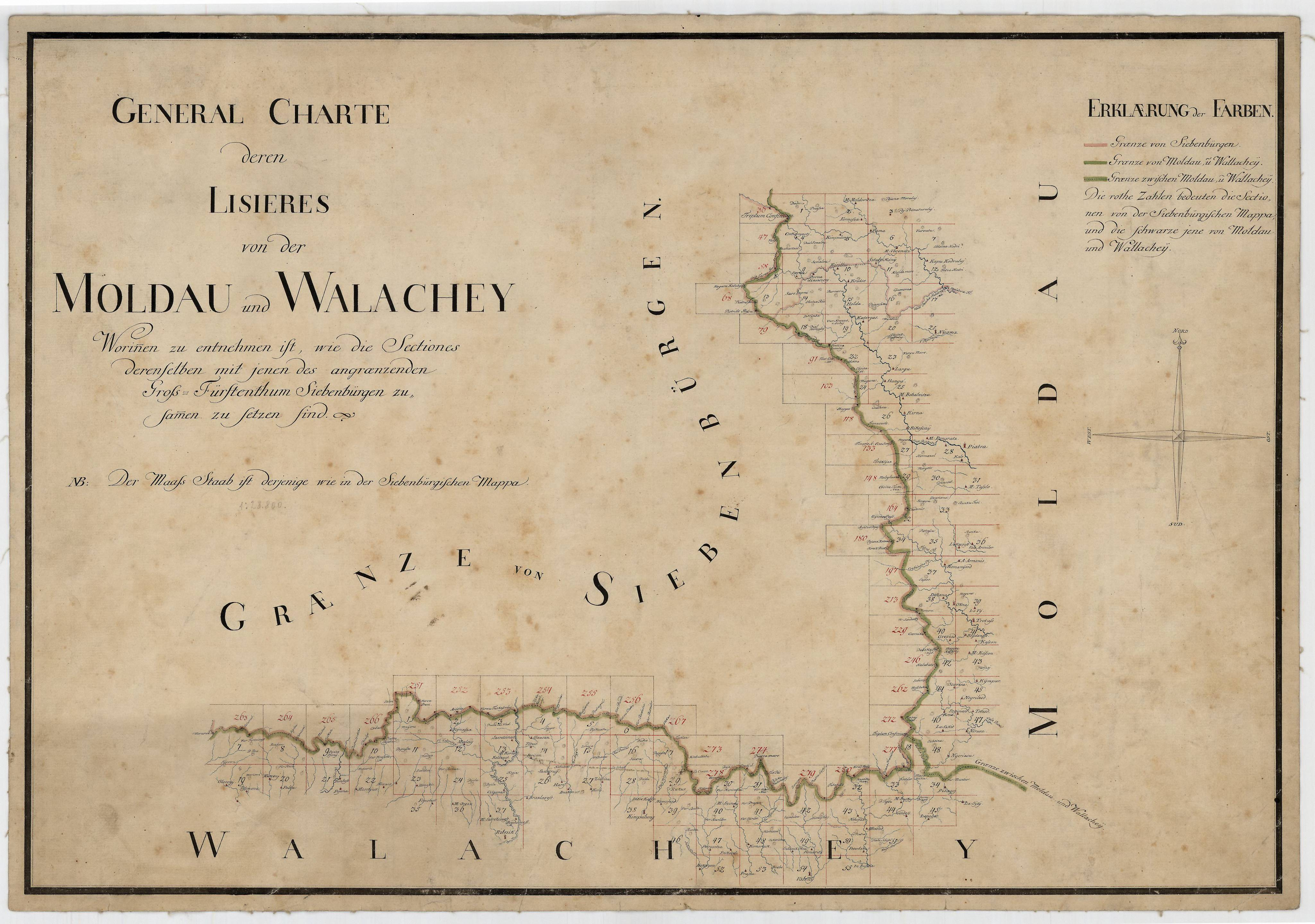
Palta (Bâlta), now part of Runcu commune on a Josephine Map (1769–1772)

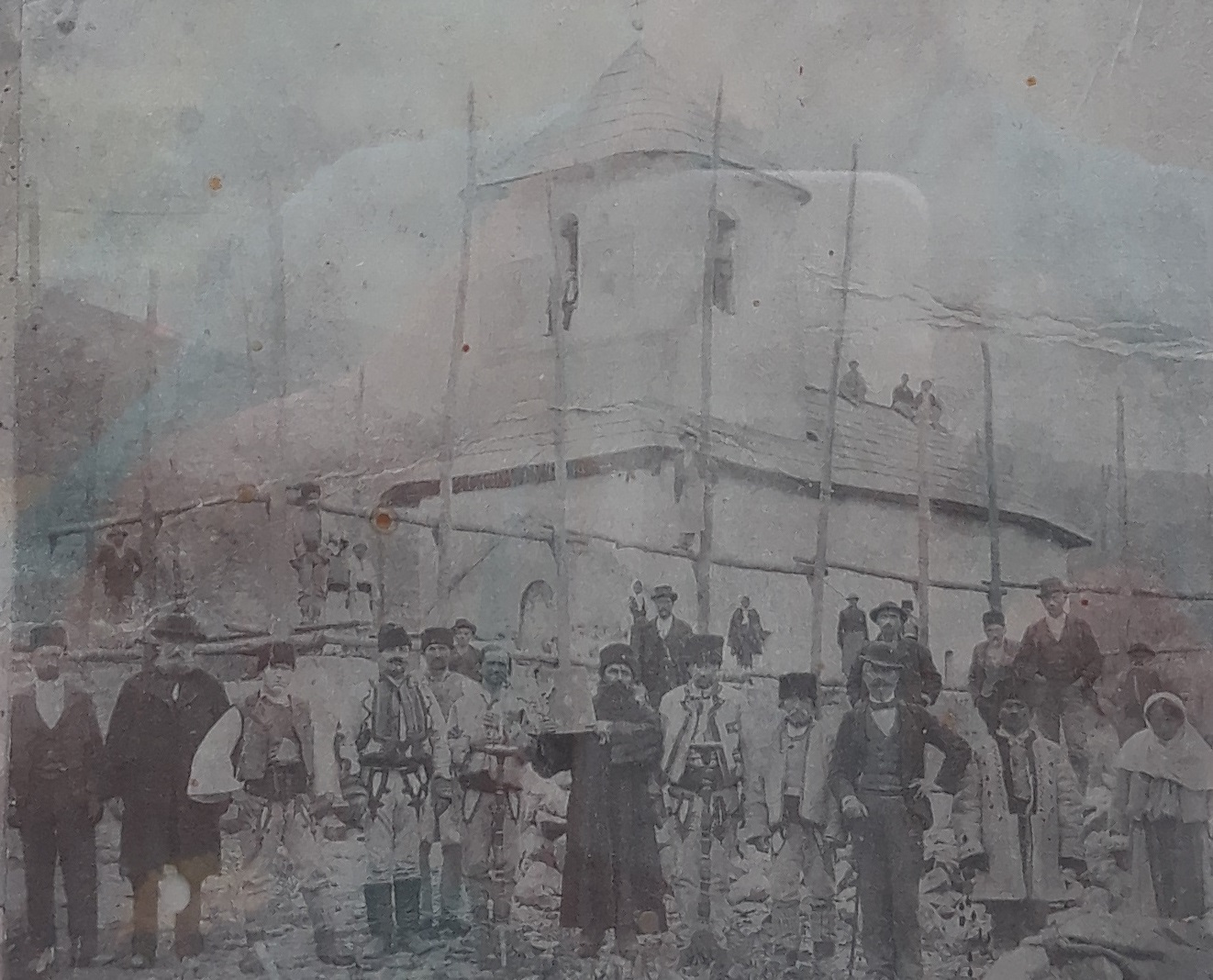
Runcu old church right before its demolition in 1897

Runcu Church built between 1897–1907

Memorial to World War I local heroes

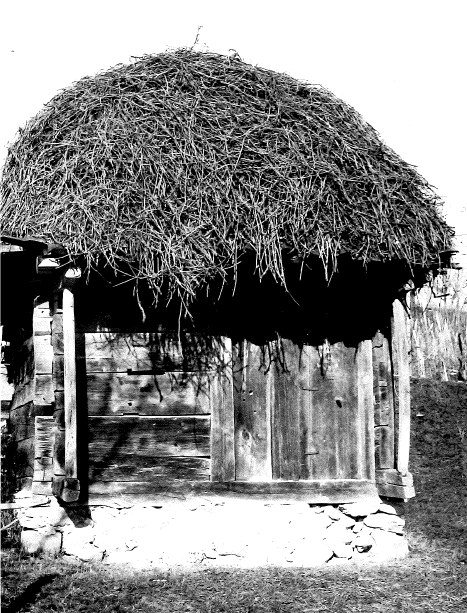
Wine cellar on a hillside near Runcu c. 1980

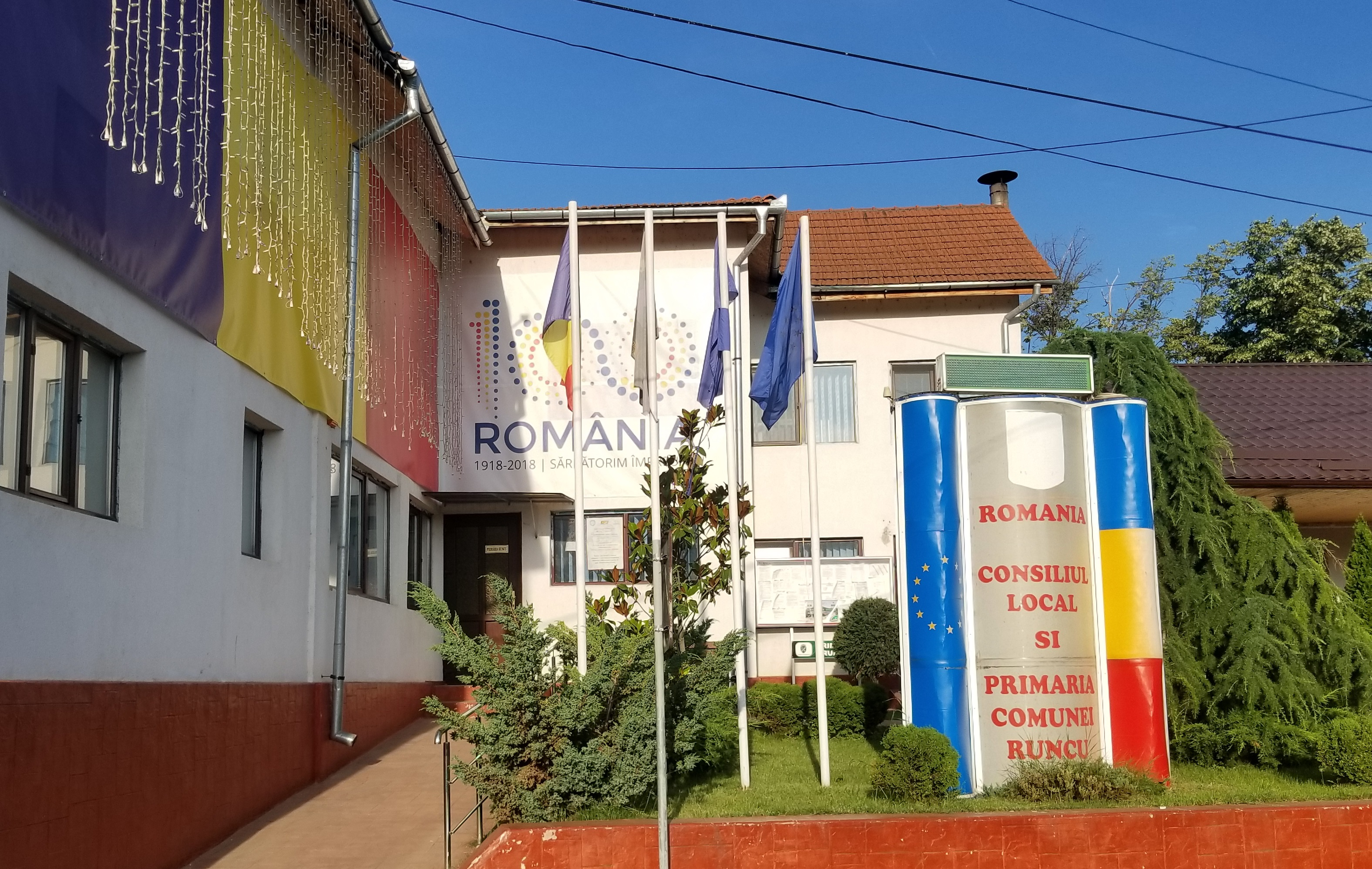
Runcu town hall

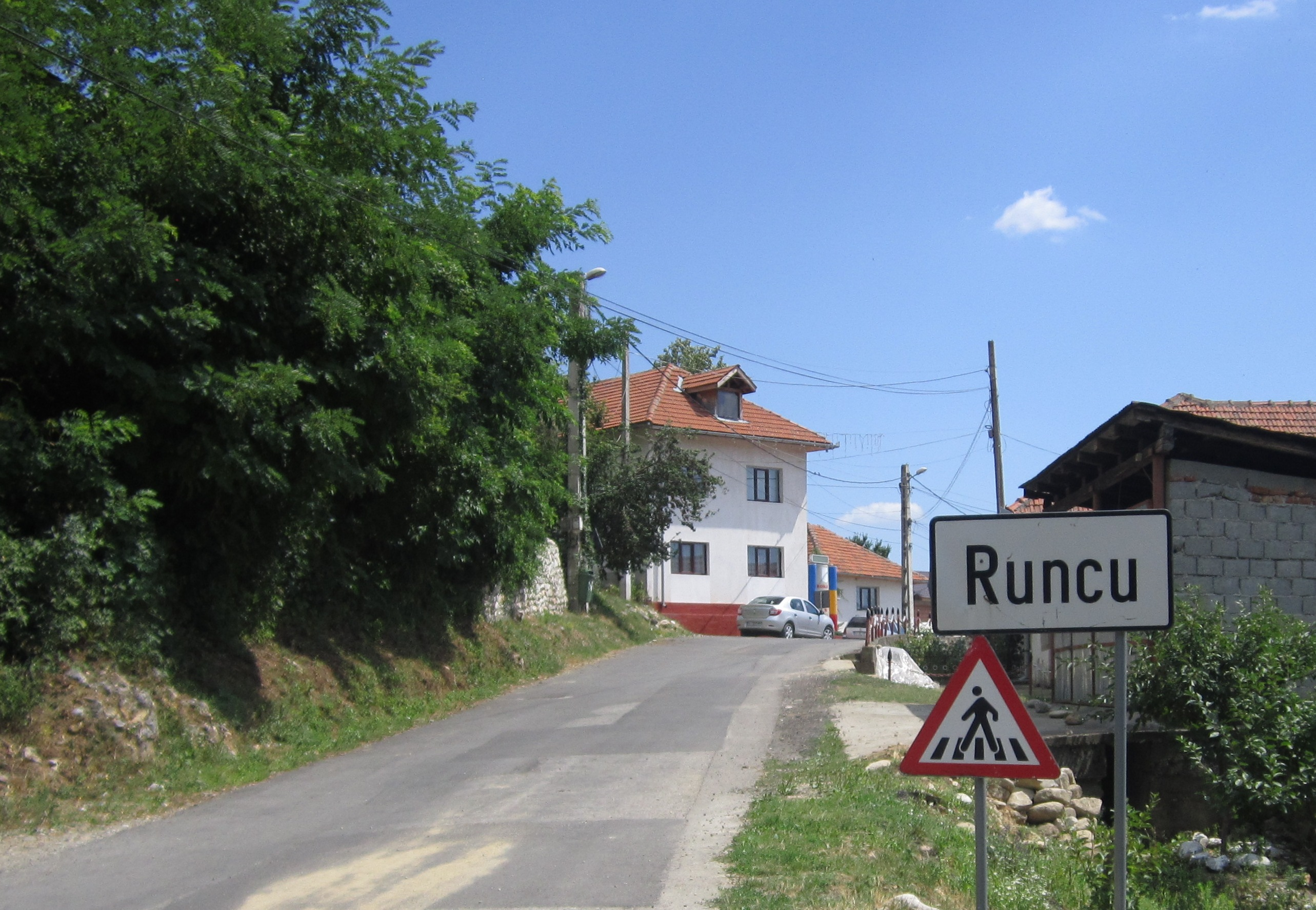
Runcu town hall

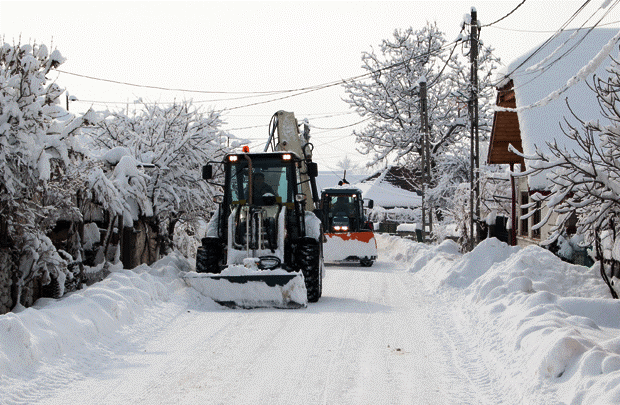
Winter time in Runcu

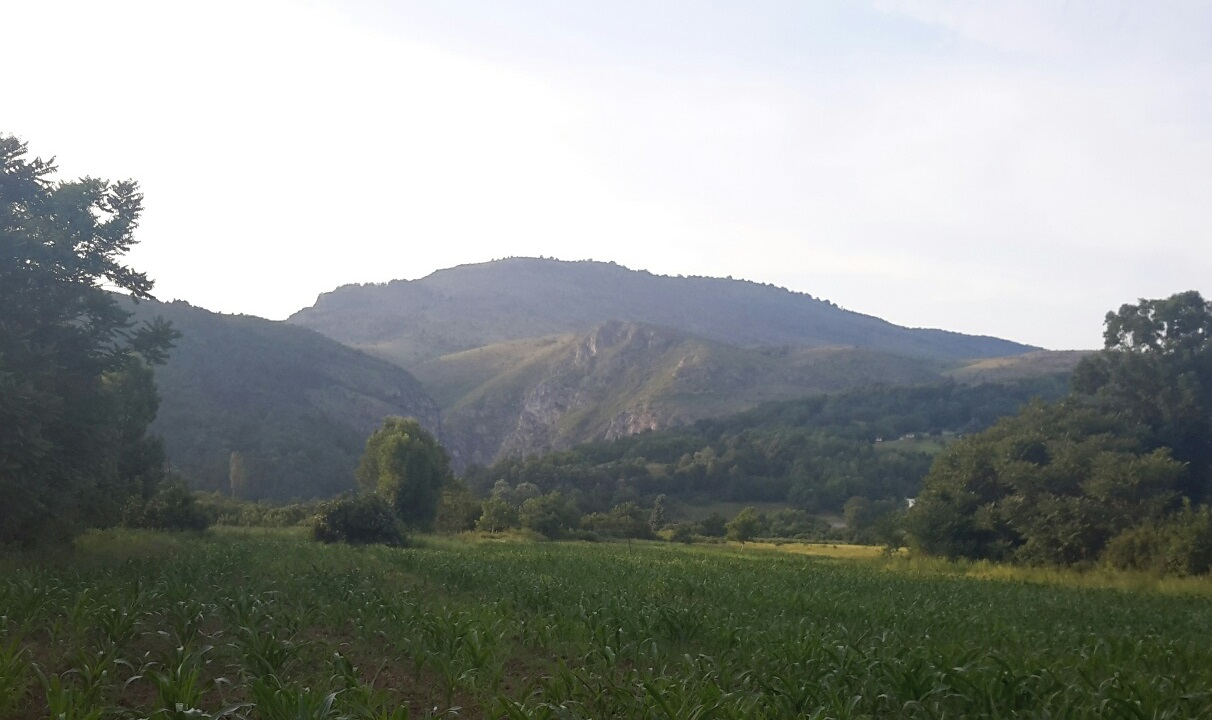
Cornfield near Runcu with the Tufoaia Mountain in the background

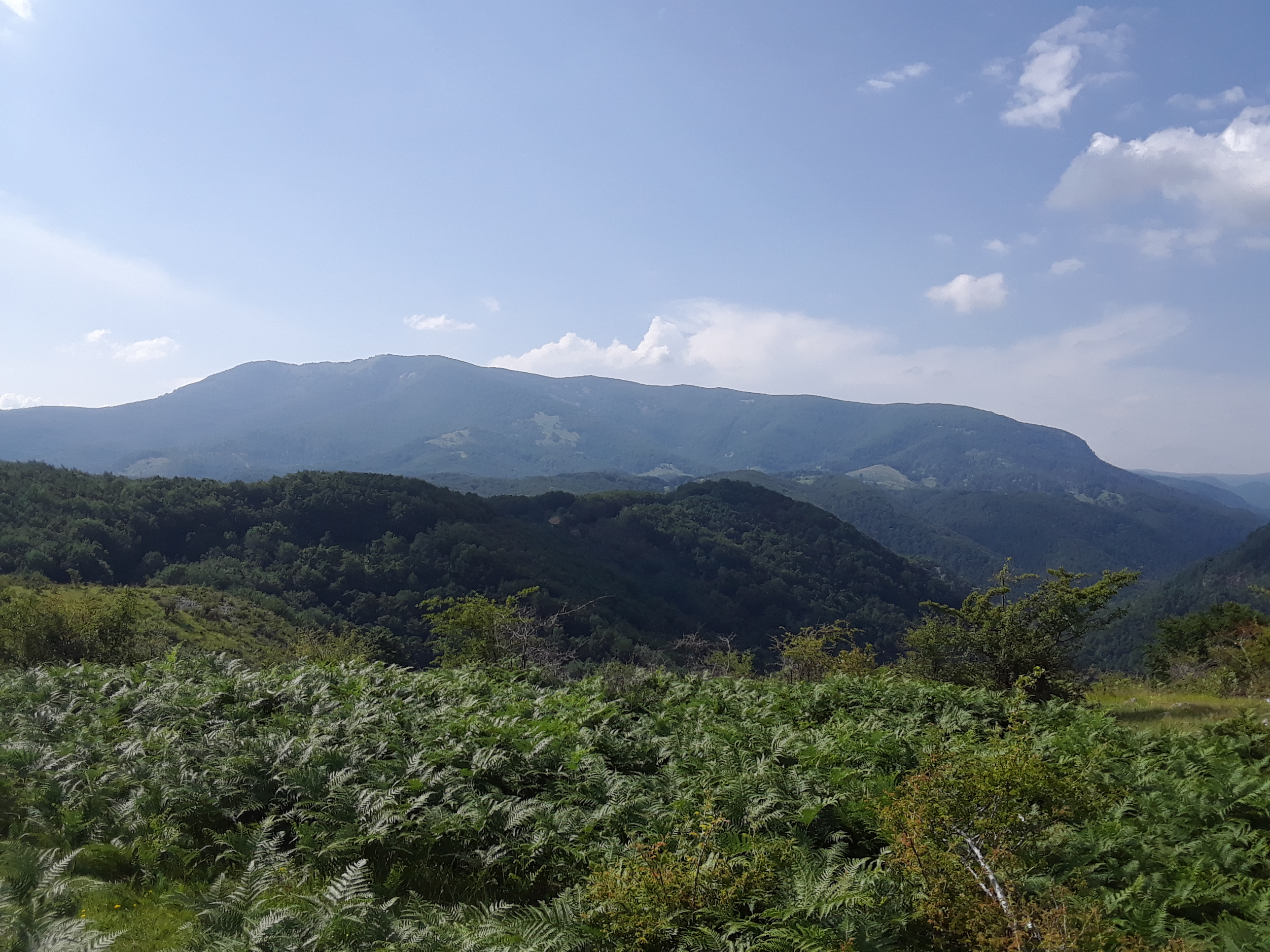
Pleșa peak seen from Cornetul Mountain.

== Historic photos ==
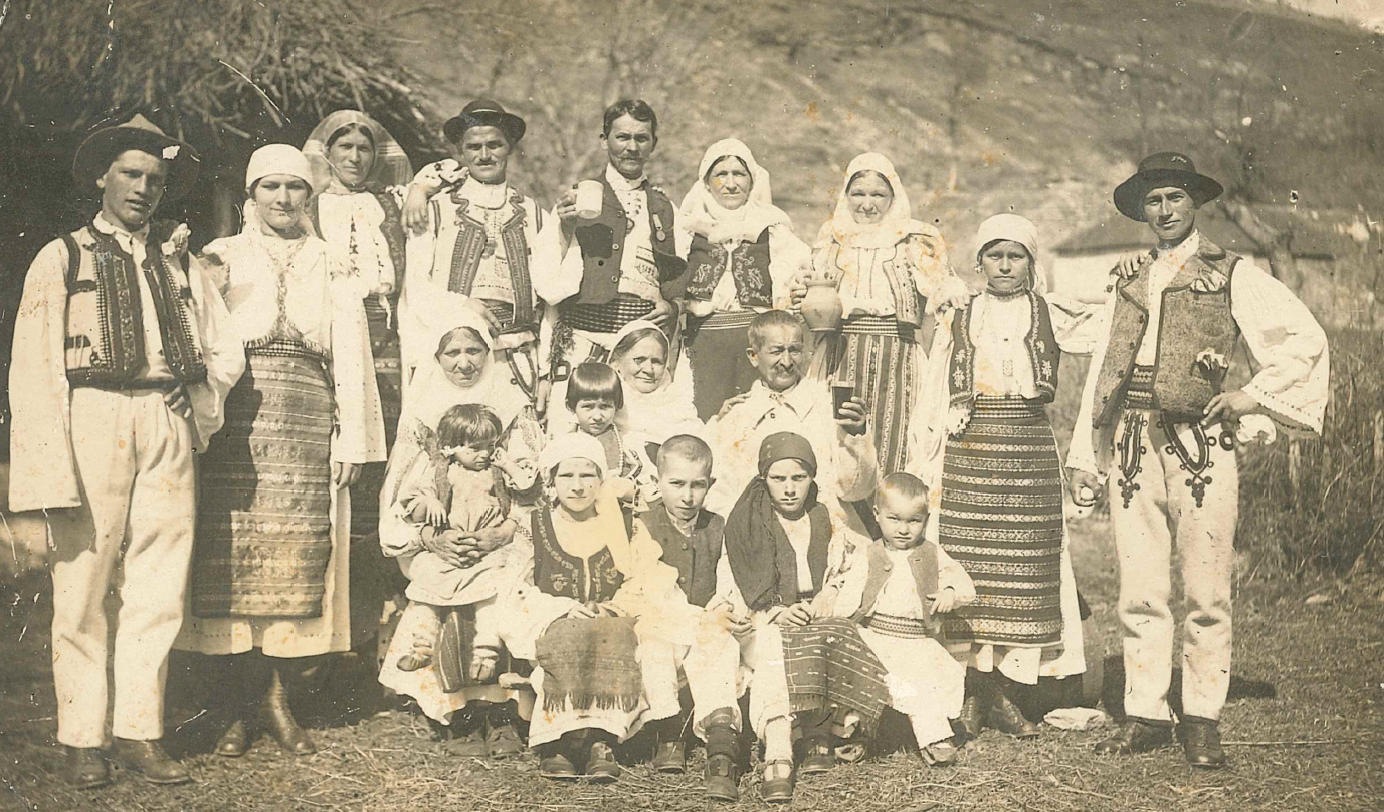

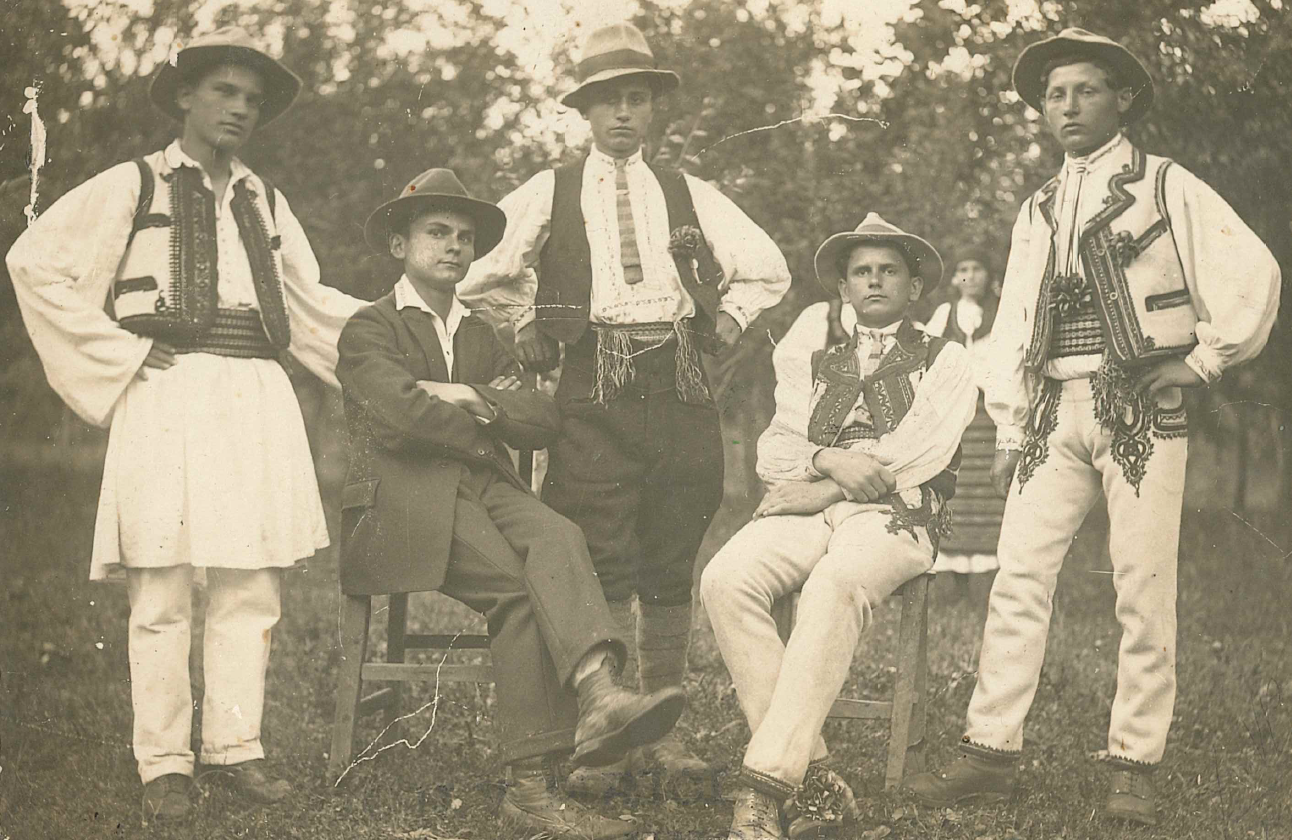

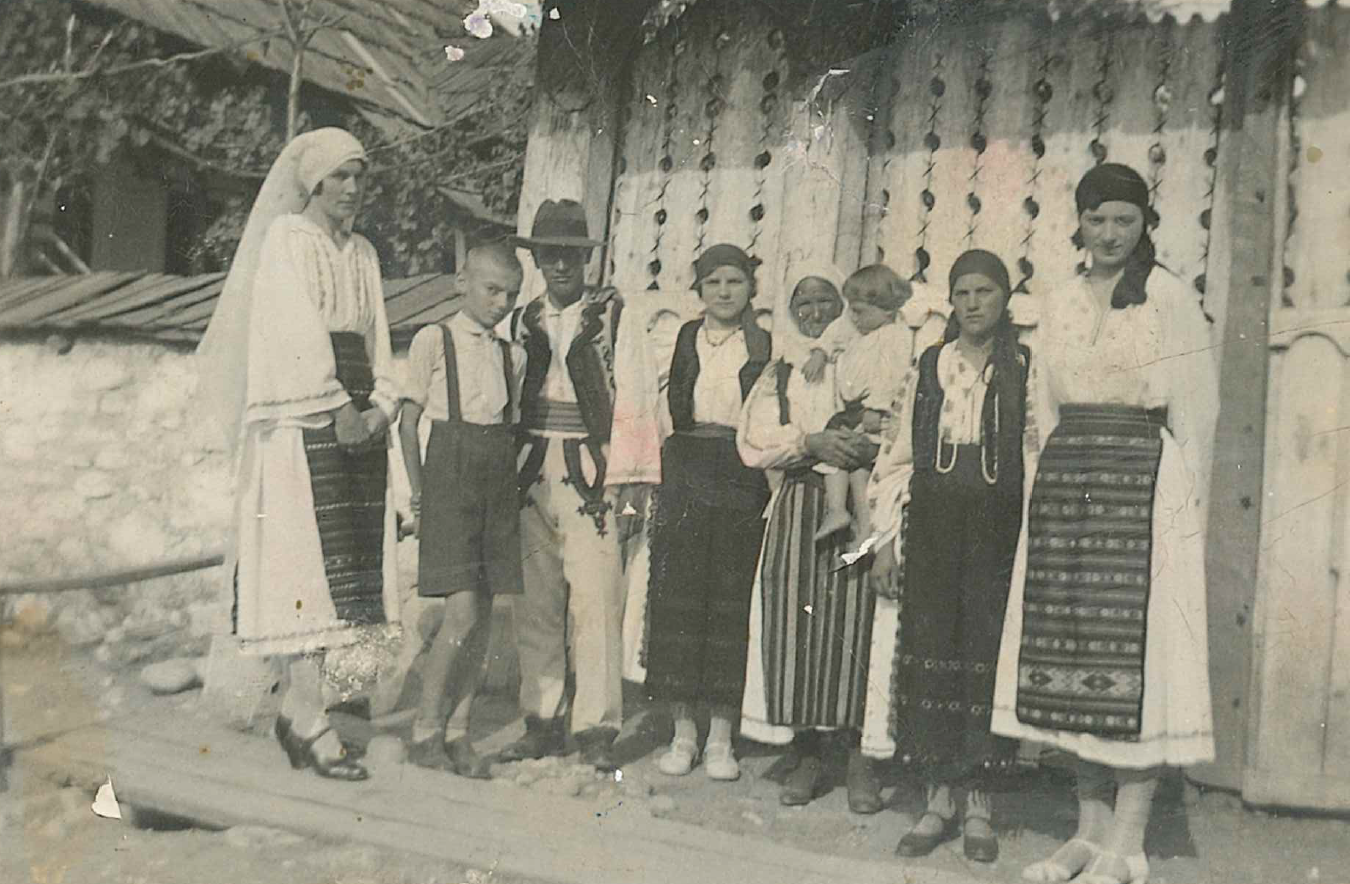

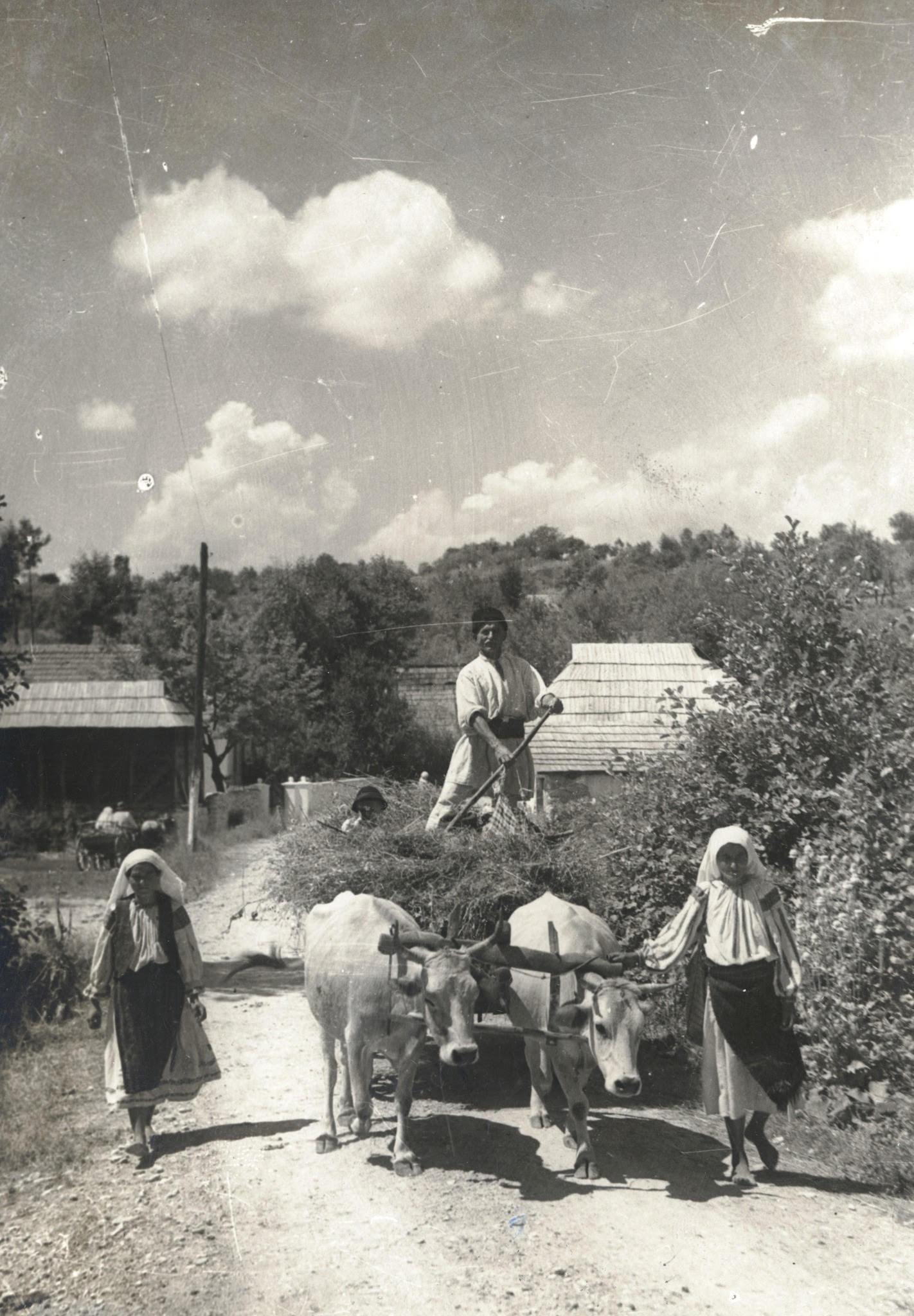

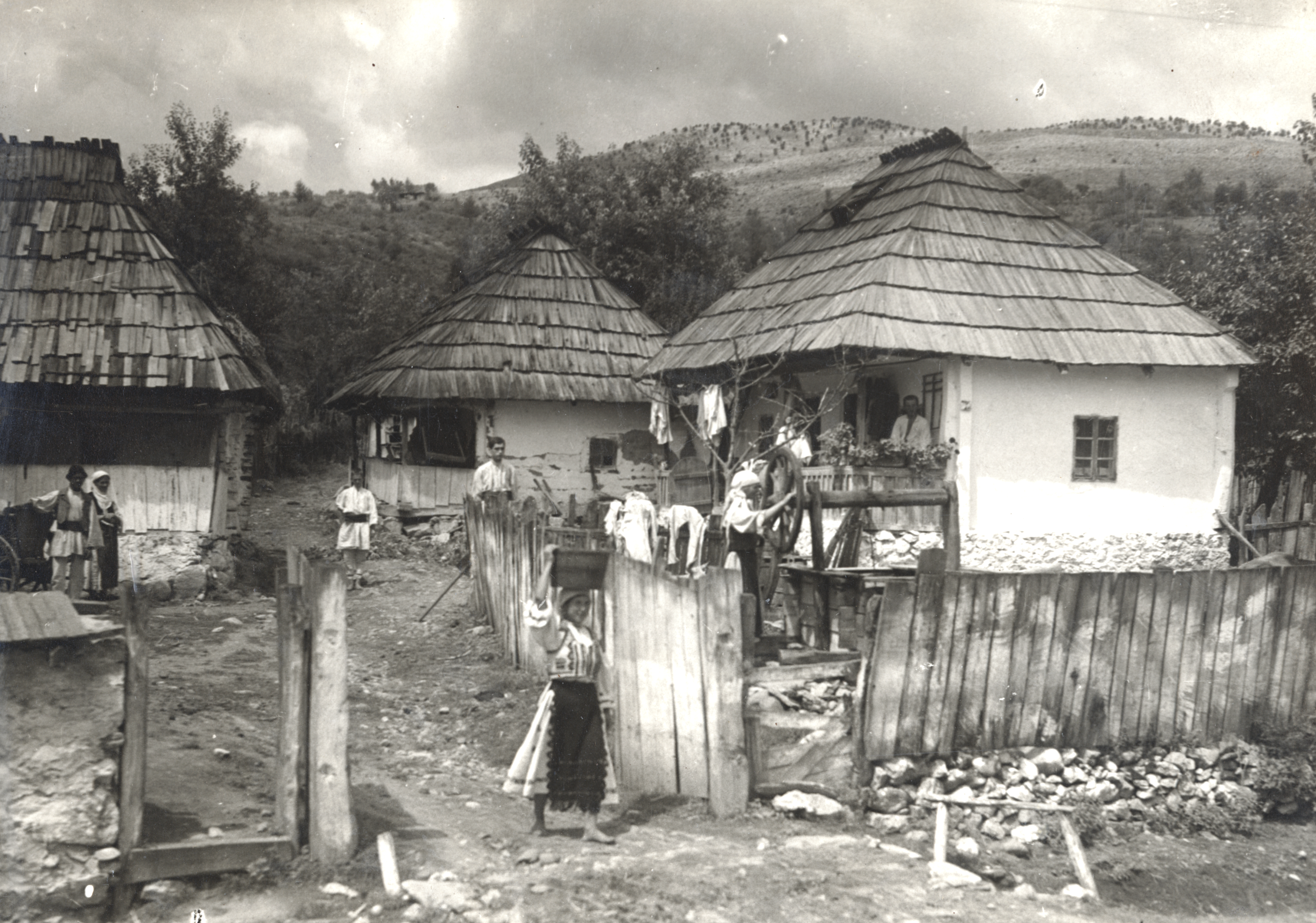

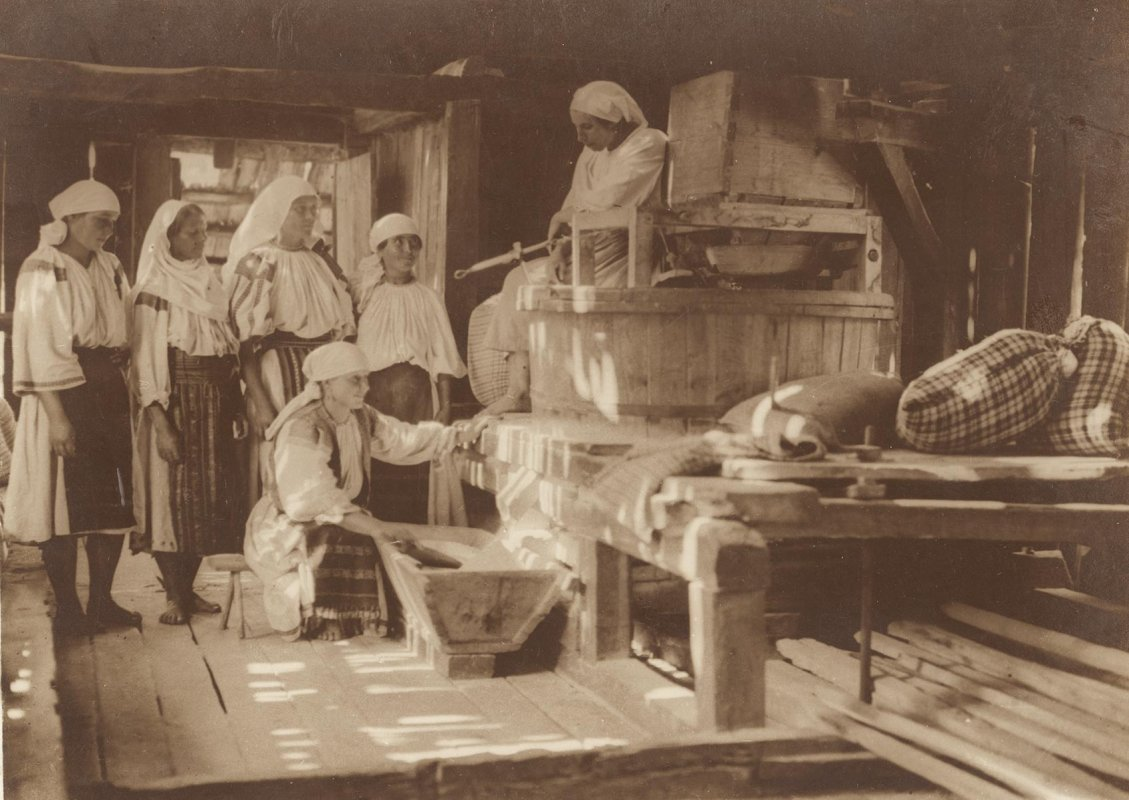

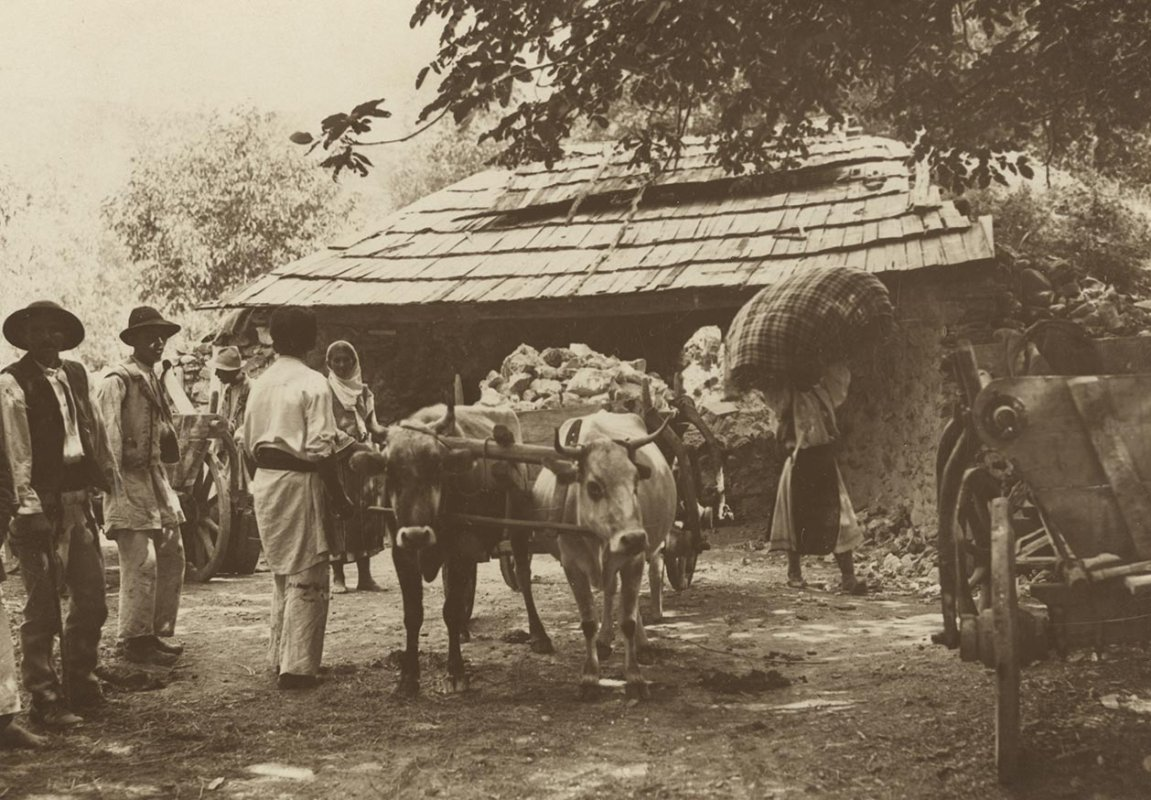

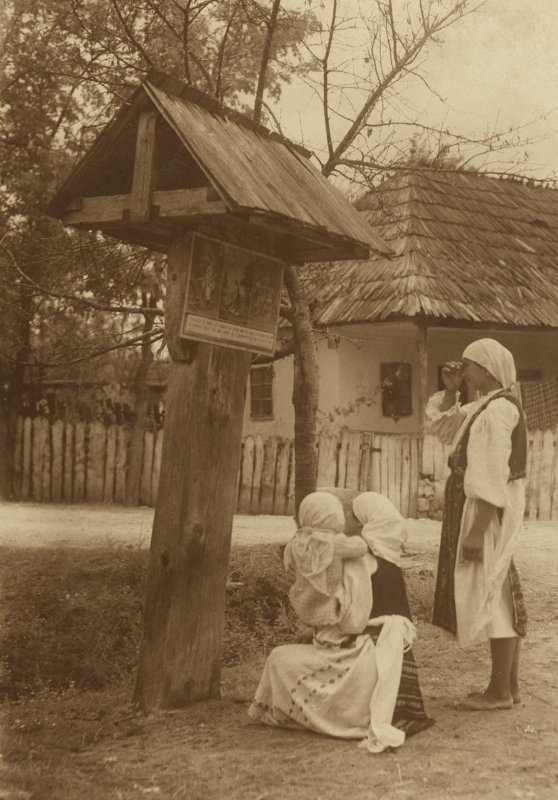

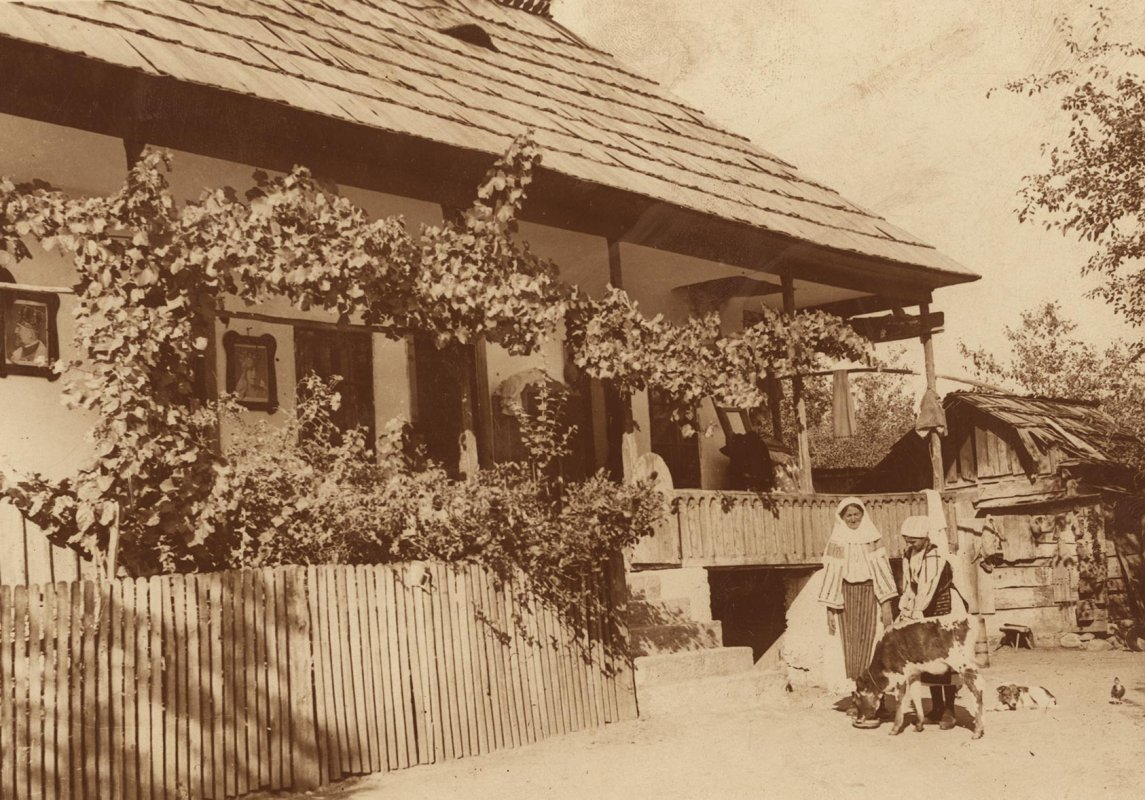

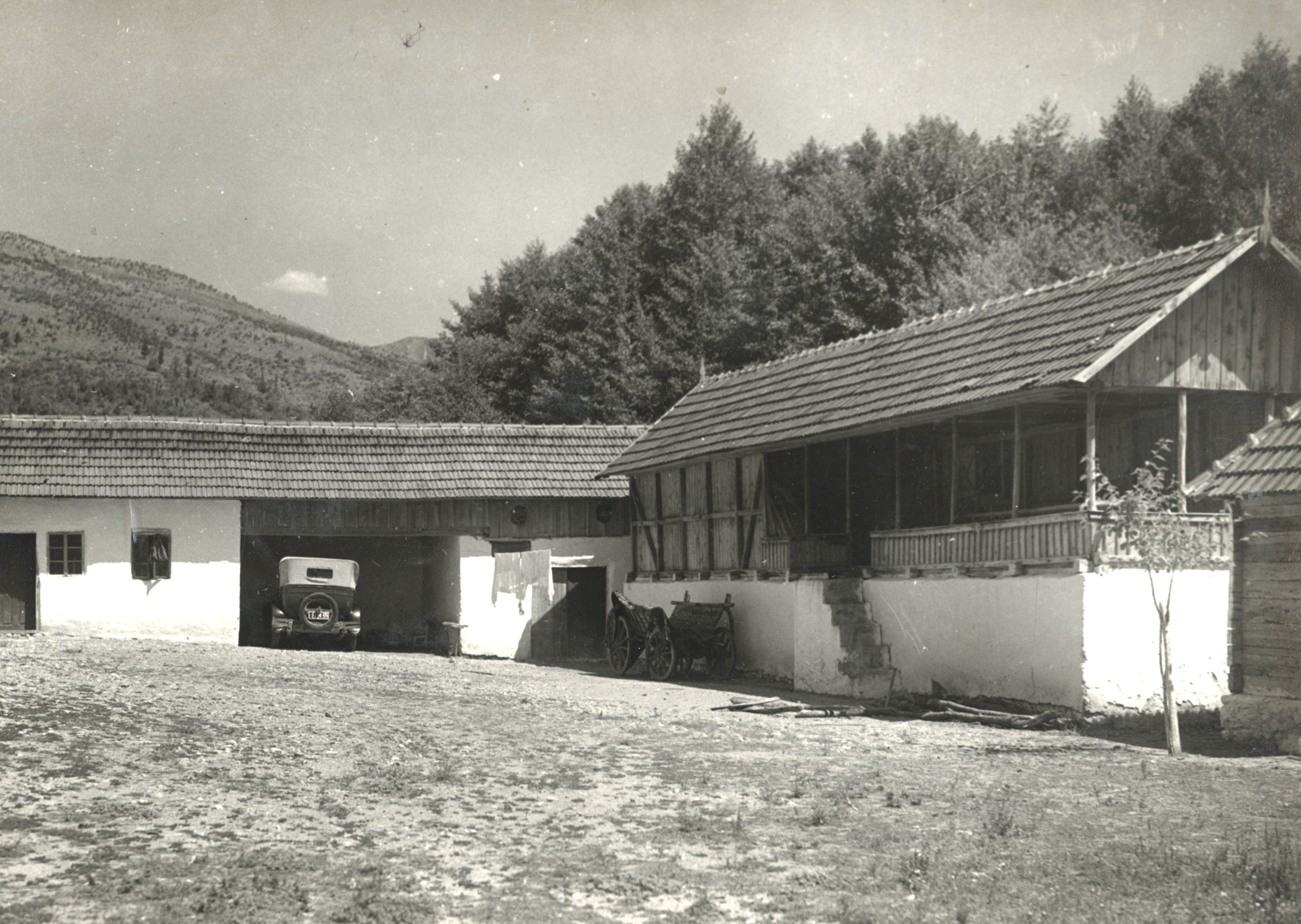
