= Bălești, Gorj =

Bălești
- Commune
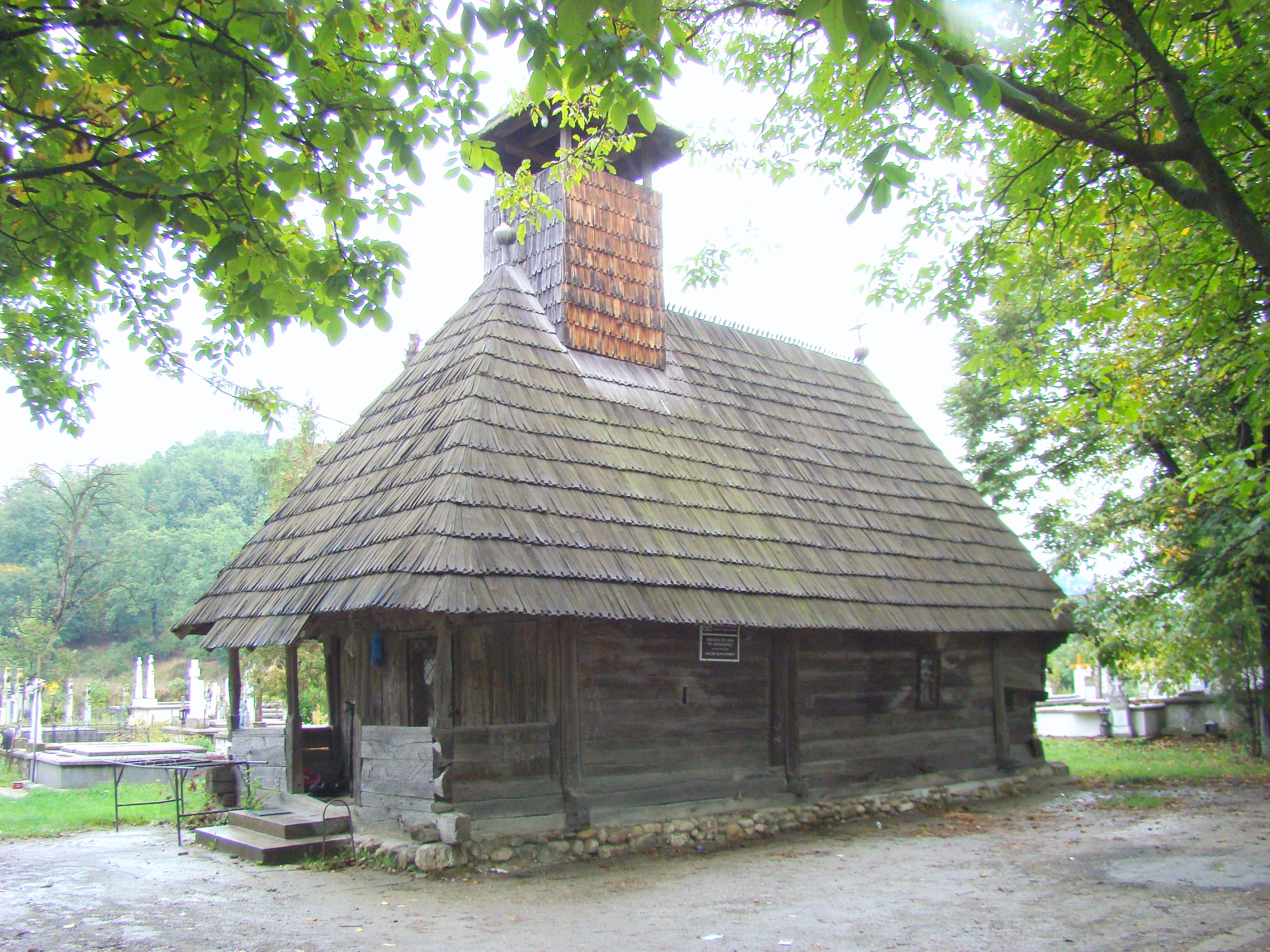
- Church of the Holy Archangels from Ceauru

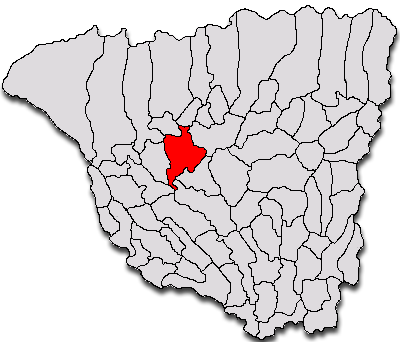
- Location in Gorj County

- Location in Romania
- Coordinates: 45°01′N 23°13′E
- Country: Romania
- County: Gorj
- Subdivisions: Bălești, Ceauru, Cornești, Găvănești, Rasova, Stolojani, Tălpășești, Tămășești, Voinigești

Government
  - Mayor (2020–2024): Mădălin-Ion Ungureanu (PSD)
- Area: 78.86 km^{2} (30.45 sq mi)
- Population (2021-12-01): 7,309
  - Density: 92.68/km^{2} (240.0/sq mi)
- Time zone: UTC+02:00 (EET)
  - Summer (DST): UTC+03:00 (EEST)
- Postal code: 217045
- Vehicle reg.: GJ
- Website: balesti.ro

Bălești is a commune in Gorj County, Oltenia, Romania. It is composed of nine villages: Bălești, Ceauru, Cornești, Găvănești, Rasova, Stolojani, Tălpășești, Tămășești, and Voinigești.

The commune is located in the north-central part of the county. It is traversed by the DN67 road, which connects the county seat, Târgu Jiu, to Drobeta-Turnu Severin.

The commune's Church of the Holy Archangels dates to 1679.

== Natives ==
- Nicolae Militaru
