= Arcani, Gorj =

Arcani
- Commune
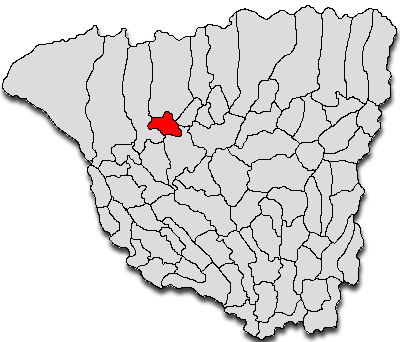
- Location in Gorj County

- Location in Romania
- Coordinates: 45°05′N 23°08′E
- Country: Romania
- County: Gorj
- Subdivisions: Arcani, Câmpofeni, Sănătești, Stroiești
- Area: 26.97 km^{2} (10.41 sq mi)
- Population (2021-12-01): 1,363
  - Density: 50.54/km^{2} (130.9/sq mi)
- Time zone: UTC+02:00 (EET)
  - Summer (DST): UTC+03:00 (EEST)
- Vehicle reg.: GJ

Arcani is a commune in Gorj County, Oltenia, Romania. It is composed of four villages: Arcani, Câmpofeni, Sănătești and Stroiești.
