= Helmut Irblich =

German architect

Helmut Irblich (born 7 June 1930 in Jägerndorf [Krnov], Czechoslovakia; died 5 June 2026 in Schweinfurt) was a German architect and building contractor in Schweinfurt. In 1989 he was awarded the Federal Cross of Merit for his diverse social engagement and in particular for his services to the promotion of commercial vocational training. He received another honor in 2011 from the Bavarian Ministry of Economic Affairs for his life's work, especially for his services to the economic development of the Schweinfurt region.

Helmut Irblich is a witness of the rescue of the Synagogue of Jägerndorf (Krnov) in 1938 by his father Franz Irblich from the destruction ordered by the Nazi regime in the Reichspogromnacht. He is engaged since the 1990s in Czech-German-Jewish dialogue and cooperation in his hometown of Jägerndorf / Krnov.

== Literature ==
- Konrad Badenheuer, Wilfried Heller: Notiz zur Rettung der Synagoge von Jägerndorf (Krnov) [Notice on how the Jägerndorf (Krnov) Synagogue was Saved; in German]. In: Wilfried Heller (Hrsg.): Jüdische Spuren im ehemaligen Sudetenland [Jewish Relicts in the former Sudetenland]. Verlag Inspiration Un Limited, London/ Berlin 2019, ISBN 978-3-945127-26-1, S. 157–164
- Helmut Irblich: Die Synagoge von Jägerndorf [The Krnov Synagogue], Schweinfurt 2001; 2nd edition 2018.
