= Franz Irblich =

German architect

Franz Irblich (born 27 November 1905 in Krnov [at that time: Jägerndorf, Austria-Hungary] – 19 April 1960 Schweinfurt) was a Sudeten German architect, construction entrepreneur and member of the city council of Krnov. He is credited by German and Jewish sources to be the key person of the exemption of the Krnov Synagogue from destruction in the November 1938 pogrom.

== Irblich and the Krnov Synagogue ==
The Krnov Synagogue stopped to be used for religious services in October 1938, when the Sudetenland was incorporated into Nazi Germany. Not long afterwards, on 9 November 1938, almost all synagogues in the surrounding towns – as anywhere in Nazi Germany – were destroyed during the Reichskristallnacht prosecution.

However, the Krnov synagogue was saved. End of October 1938, the mayor of Jägerndorf, Oskar König (in office from 1938 to 1940), had received a secret order from Berlin by phone to destroy and burn down the synagogue of his town on 9 November. Unwilling to comply, he summoned a meeting of the councillors and informed them about the order he had received. The Sudeten councillors then unanimously accepted the proposal of the builder Franz Irblich to deceive the Nazis: They decided to remove all symbols of the Jewish religion from the building and change it into a town market hall, reporting to Berlin that there was no synagogue in Jägerndorf which could be destroyed. As such the building was used until the end of World War II in 1945.

To deceive the responsibles in Berlin even more, on 9 November the local officials set on fire two barrels of gasoline in front of the city's Jewish cemetery which produced big clouds of dark smoke. Pictures of this event were taken and published in the local newspaper insinuating that the Jewish funeral hall had been burning. In fact the building hasn't been damaged and survived the war just like the synagogue.

== Post-war development ==
After the world war II, the synagogue was used by the Czechoslovak state first as a warehouse, then as a local archive building. In 1994 only, Czech Republic announced to return the building to the Jewish community, which actually happened in 1999. Today the building is administrated by the Jewish community in Olomouc (German: Olmütz) and used for exhibitions and other cultural purposes with no Jewish community in Krnov existing anymore. The merits of Franz Irblich as saviour of the synagogue are acknowledged by the Jewish community. In the lobby of the synagogue a portrait of him is displayed with the inscription in Czech and German "Franz Irblich, Saviour of the Synagogue".

== Literature ==
- Badenheuer, Konrad / Heller, Wilfried: Notiz zur Rettung der Synagoge von Jägerndorf (Krnov). [Notice on how the Jägerndorf (Krnov) Synagogue was Saved] in: Heller, Wilfried (Editor): Jüdische Spuren im ehemaligen Sudetenland. [Jewish Relicts in the former Sudetenland] Verlag Inspiration Un Limited, London/Berlin 2019, ISBN 978-3-945127-26-1, p. 157–164 [In German].
- Irblich, Helmut: Die Synagoge von Jägerndorf [The Krnov Synagogue; in German], Schweinfurt 2001 (2nd edition 2018), p. 8-13
