= Joachim Oppenheim =

Czech rabbi and author (1832 – 1891)

Joachim (Ḥayyim) Oppenheim, also known as Joachim Heinrich Oppenheim (29 September 1832 – 27 April 1891), was a Czech rabbi and author.

== Biography ==
He was born at Ivančice, Moravia. After receiving his first instruction from his father, Bernhard Oppenheim, rabbi of Ivančice, he went to Brno, where he attended the gymnasium (1849-1853), and then entered the University of Vienna, continuing his Talmudic studies under Rabbi Lazar Horowitz.

Having graduated in 1857, he succeeded his brother David, as rabbi of Jemnice in 1858, and his father as rabbi of Ivančice in 1860. In 1868, he was called to serve as rabbi of Toruń. He held this last rabbinate until his death on 27 April 1891, in Berlin, where he had undergone a surgical operation.

Of Oppenheim's independent publications, only two sermons are known, entitled "Das Tal-Gebet" (Vienna, 1862); but he was a frequent contributor to Jewish scientific magazines, writing by preference in Hebrew. Oppenheim contributed to Zecharias Frankel's "Monatsschrift für die Geschichte und Wissenschaft des Judenthums", S. Sonneschein's "Homiletische Monatsschrift", Joseph Isaac Kobak's "Jeschurun", "Ha-Maggid", "Ha-Karmel", "Ha-Shaḥar", "Bet Talmud", and to various Hebrew year-books.

His history of the compilation of the Mishnah, "Toledot ha-Mishnah", published originally in the second volume of the "Bet Talmud", was published separately in Presburg, 1882.

Oppenheim was married to Helene Oppenheim (1839-1929). Their son, Berthold Oppenheim, was the rabbi of Olomouc.
