= Olomouc Synagogue =

Destroyed Orthodox synagogue in Olomouc, Czech Republic

- Czech: Synagoga v Olomouci
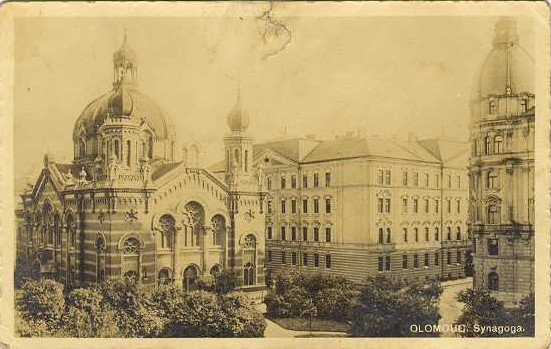
- A postcard of the former synagogue in c. 1900

- Location of the former synagogue in the Czech Republic

Religion
- Affiliation: Orthodox Judaism (former)
- Ecclesiastical or organisational status: Synagogue (1897–1939)
- Status: Destroyed

Location
- Location: Olomouc
- Country: Czech Republic
- Coordinates: 49°35′26″N 17°15′02″E

Architecture
- Architect: Jakob Gärtner
- Type: Synagogue architecture
- Style: Moorish Revival
- Founder: Rabbi Dr. Berthold Oppenheim
- Established: c. 1850s (as a congregation)
- Completed: 1897
- Destroyed: March 1939

The Olomouc Synagogue (Czech: Synagoga v Olomouci) was a former Orthodox Jewish synagogue, located in Olomouc, in the Czech Republic. The synagogue was built in 1897 and was destroyed during a Nazi attack in March 1939.

== History ==
In the late 1850s, Olomouc's "Izraelitische Cultusverein", the religious society, was founded. From 1859, the congregation rented halls for regular worship due to the efforts of Hermann Zweig and the well-known Jewish scholar and physician, Adolf Brecher. These services were officially approved by the authorities in 1860; and in 1863, an entire floor, which was subsequently acquired by the community, was dedicated by the Rev. Dr Schmiedl, at that time of Prossnitz, and subsequently of Vienna. In 1892, the "Cultusverein" was changed into a "Cultusgemeinde", and its constitution was confirmed two years later in conformity with the law of 20 March 1890. It was then that the notion of building a synagogue arose.

In 1894, the community purchased a site adjacent to the Teresian Gate. The new synagogue, designed by Jakob Gärtner (1861–1921), was completed in and duly consecrated by Rabbi DR. Berthold Oppenheim, the first rabbi of the community, on 11 April 1897. A two-storey building with flats and offices for administrative use was built adjacent to the synagogue. In 1904, the town of 21,933 had a Jewish population of 1,676.

The edifice was one of the biggest and finest synagogues in Czechoslovakia, but was so for only half of a century. On the night of 15–16 March 1939, the synagogue was attacked and burned to ashes. The Nazi instigators refused to let the town's firemen to extinguish the flames. Looters salvaged what remained of the synagogue's ornaments and furnishings until 1941 when the whole area was transformed into a grassy park.

=== Torah scrolls ===
Three Torah scrolls were sipped to the Jewish Museum Prague in 1942. In the early 1963 British lawyer and philanthropist Ralph Yablon purchased the scrolls from the Czechoslovak government and donated them to London's Westminster Synagogue, which established the Memorial Scrolls Trust that loaned them to synagogues around the world, with most going to U.S. synagogues. In 1970 one of the scrolls was loaned to Peninsula Sinai Congregation in Foster City, California, where it was used for religious services.

The Olomouc Jewish community was reborn after being decimated by the Nazis, and in 2016 they contacted the Memorial Scrolls Trust (MST) to allocate a Czech scroll to them, preferably from Olomouc. As Peninsula Sinai Congregation had two Czech scrolls, they agreed to return the Olomouc one which was not in use, to the MST so it could be allocated to the new Olomouc community. The Peninsula Sinai Congregation community, had the scroll restored and in October 2017, Rabbi Helfand, Cantor Doron Shapira, Linda Oberstein, Steve Lipman, Ron and Liz Mester, and Andrea Hawksley and Andy Lutomirski, accompanied Torah to Olomouc, where they were also joined by Rabbi Druin. At a ceremony on 22 October 2017, the last letters were restored, the scroll was formally allocated on indefinite loan to the community by Jeffrey Ohrenstein chairman of the Memorial Scrolls Trust and festively installed in the Jewish prayer room on the occasion of the Jewish Culture Days in Olomouc. It was the first of 1,564 Bohemian and Moravian scrolls in the Memorial Scrolls Trust collection to be allocated on loan to a Czech community. Since then, a fully restored scroll has been allocated to Ec Chajim, a progressive community in Prague led by Rabbi David Max and a non-kossher scroll to the community in Liberec.

== Gallery ==
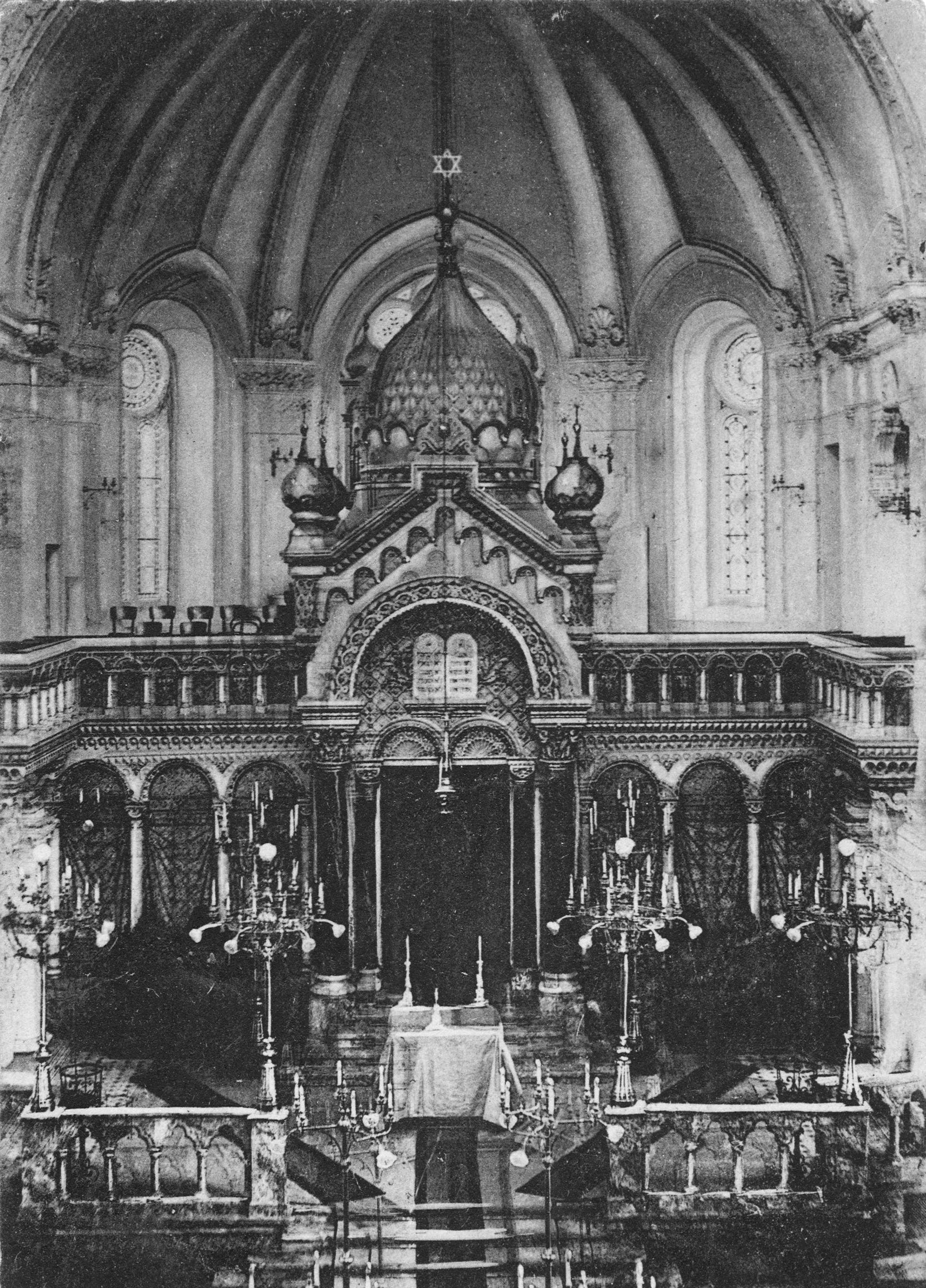
Interior in 1905

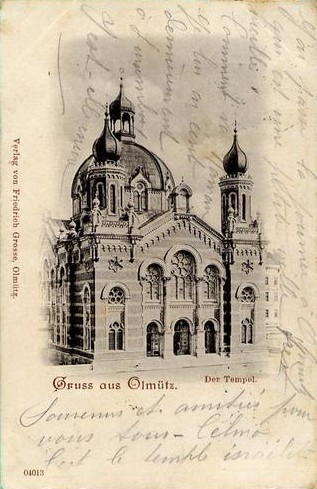
Postcard c. 1899

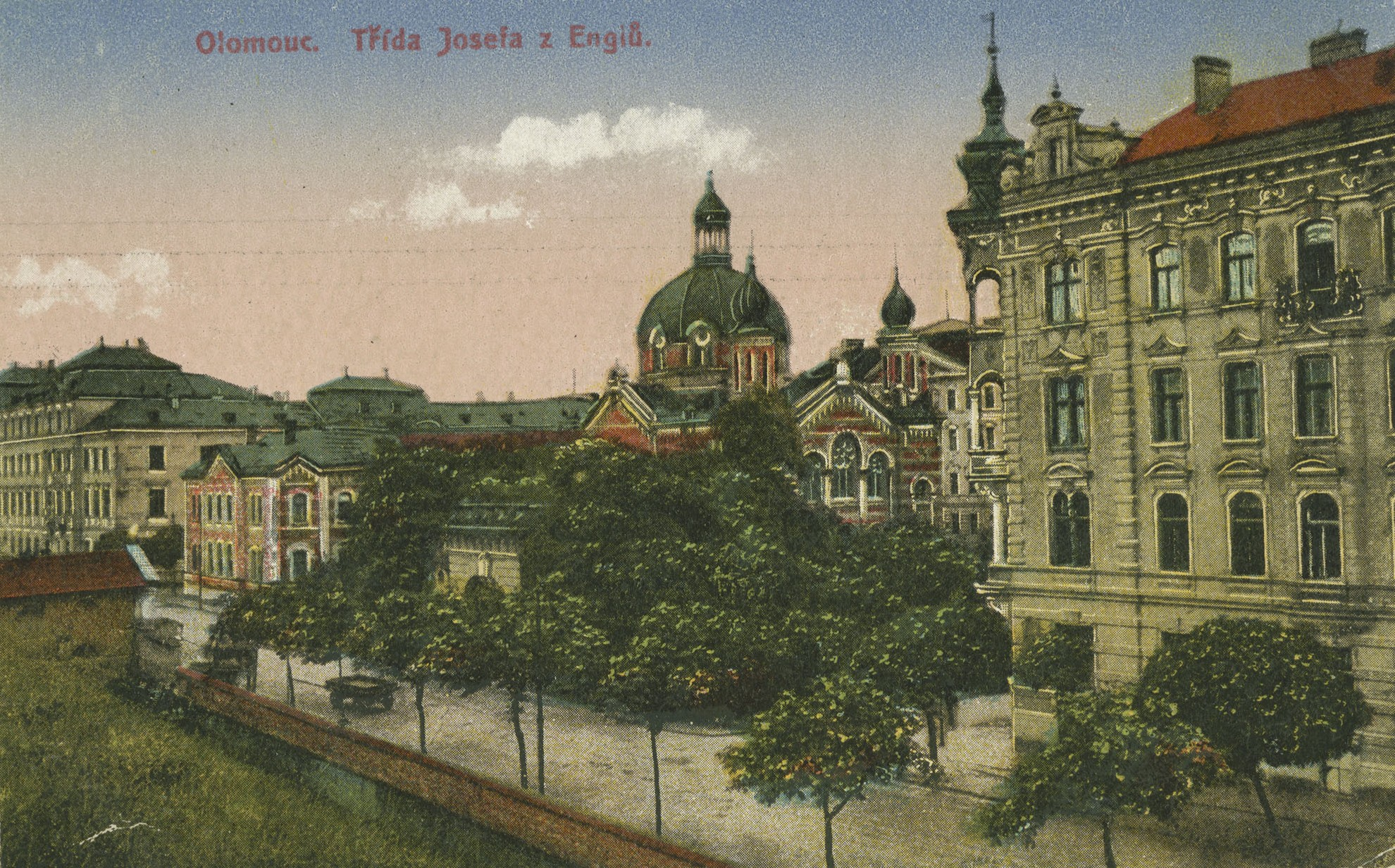
Postcard early 1900s

An 1899 map showing the "Isr.[aelit] Temple" on the corner of Temple-Gasse & Nieder-Gasse

== See also ==
- History of the Jews in the Czech Republic
- Krnov Synagogue
