= Berthold Oppenheim =

Moravian rabbi (1867–1942)

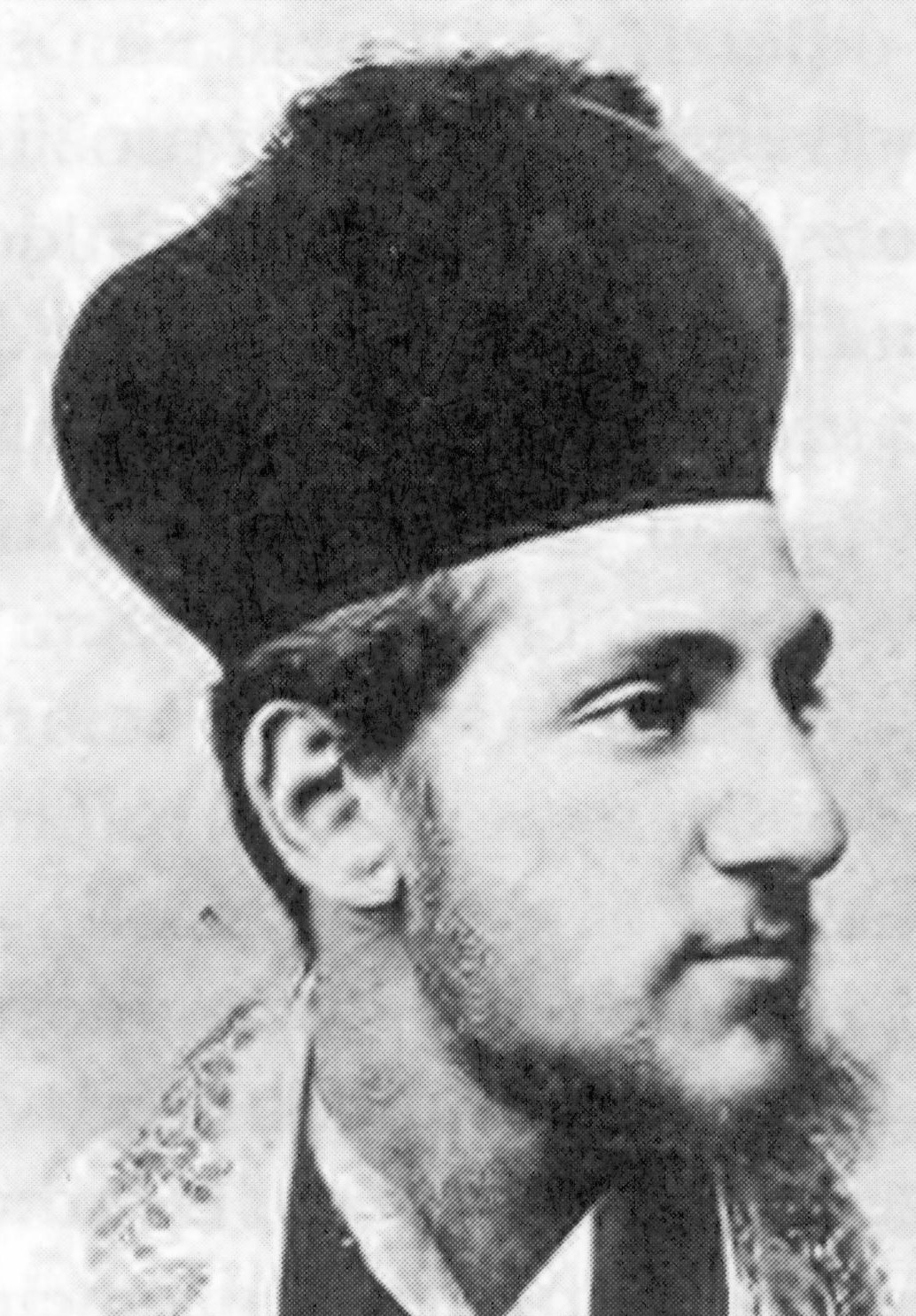
- Berthold Oppenheim, c. 1892

Personal life
- Born: 29 July 1867 Ivančice, Moravia, Austro-Hungary
- Died: 1942 (aged 74–75) Treblinka extermination camp, General Government, Nazi Germany
- Parents: Joachim Oppenheim (1832–1891) (father); Helene Oppenheim (1839-1929) (mother)

Religious life
- Religion: Judaism

Jewish leader
- Residence: Olomouc

Berthold Oppenheim (1867–1942) was the rabbi of Olomouc, Moravia, from 1892 to 1939. He was murdered in 1942 at the Treblinka extermination camp.

== Life ==
Oppenheim was born on July 29, 1867, to a rabbinical family. His father, Joachim Heinrich Oppenheim, was (from 1858) a rabbi in Jemnice, South Moravia, and later (from 1868 to 1891) in Toruń, Prussia, (today in Poland). He was also a nephew of the Viennese Hebraist, Isaac Hirsch Weiss, who was married to Joachim's sister.

Berthold Oppenheim studied Hebrew and Judaism at various institutes and universities in Berlin and Wrocław.

Oppenheim came to Olomouc in 1892 from Miroslav, South Moravia, where there was a strong Jewish community and where Oppenheim was active as a rabbi in 1891/1892.

In 1892, when the independent Jewish community was established in Olomouc, Oppenheim was inaugurated as the first rabbi of the Jewish community in Olomouc. The inauguration took place on November 1, 1892.

In 1894, Oppenheim initiated the construction of the Olomouc Synagogue, which was completed in 1897.

He also gave lectures. For example, on May 7, 1898, at the sixth monthly session of the ZION Society in the Reichert Hall in Olomouc, he gave a lecture on the topic of Humanity in the Old Testament.

In 1906 he became a founding member of the Union of Moravian-Silesian Rabbis (Svazu Moravsko-slezských rabínů), which was founded in Přerov in 1906 and Oppenheim was elected as vice-chairman. He also expressed his conviction that the union could work only in close contact with the representatives of the Jewish religious communities; it should serve to increase Jewish self-esteem; to take care of Jewish literature and history; to revive the Hebrew language; to establish libraries; to organize educational and scientific lectures; and more frequent meetings of rabbis should strengthen their mutual collegial feelings.

He took part at General Meetings of the Rabbinic Union; for example, on August 21, 1907, in Ostrava (then Moravian Ostrava), where he dealt mainly with the question of social and pension provision of rabbis and employees of Jewish communities, and at a General Meeting held in Brno on March 20, 1908.

On May 28, 1908, he organized a conference of the Union of Moravian-Silesian Rabbis which took place at the German Casino in Olomouc.

In 1918, when the rabbi of Loštice, Izrael Günzig, moved to Antwerp, Belgium, Oppenheim took over this position also as rabbi of Loštice.

He also served as a member of a roughly ten-member council of Jewish communities.

He taught Hebrew at the German grammar school in Olomouc (where, for example, in the school year 1932/1933, there was a total of 40 Jewish pupils, 14.4% of the school's student body).

He also worked in the Chevra Kadisha and founded the Freitisch-Verein, which supported impoverished Jewish students in Olomouc schools.

In the 1930s, at age 65, Oppenheim visited the Land of Israel.

Oppenheim arrived in Palestine on the occasion of the 1st Maccabiah in March and April 1932 and described his journey in the Brno Zionist weekly Jüdische Volksstimme: a journey via Břeclav to Vienna and from there to Trieste, a one-day stopover in Athens, arriving at the Jaffa Harbor, from where it was only a short while to Tel Aviv. Oppenheim traveled everywhere in Palestine: "This way, I have fulfilled my desire of decades to visit the fatherland, to see biblical and historical sites."

Oppenheim served as the rabbi of Olomouc practically throughout the pre-war existence of the Jewish community in Olomouc. He remained a rabbi until 1939 and was replaced in 1940 by Rabbi Ernst Reich (until 1942).

== Deportation and death ==
On July 8, 1942, he boarded the Transport AAo from Olomouc to Theresienstadt and on October 15, 1942 he was deported with Transport Bv to Poland (so-called "transports of old") – to Treblinka, where he was murdered in the same year.

Whether he died in a gas chamber, or was killed in a so-called lazaret (which was a group of barracks surrounded by a fence and an adjoining pit full of bodies of wounded men who have resorted to believing that they would find at least elementary care here) is not known.

== Memorial plaque ==
In 1974, the synagogue corps in Olomouc left a memorial plaque for Rabbi Oppenheim, which was placed in the Jewish cemetery in Olomouc, on the gravestone of his mother Helene Oppenheim (1839-1929), beside the right wall of the cemetery chapel.

== Stolperstein ==
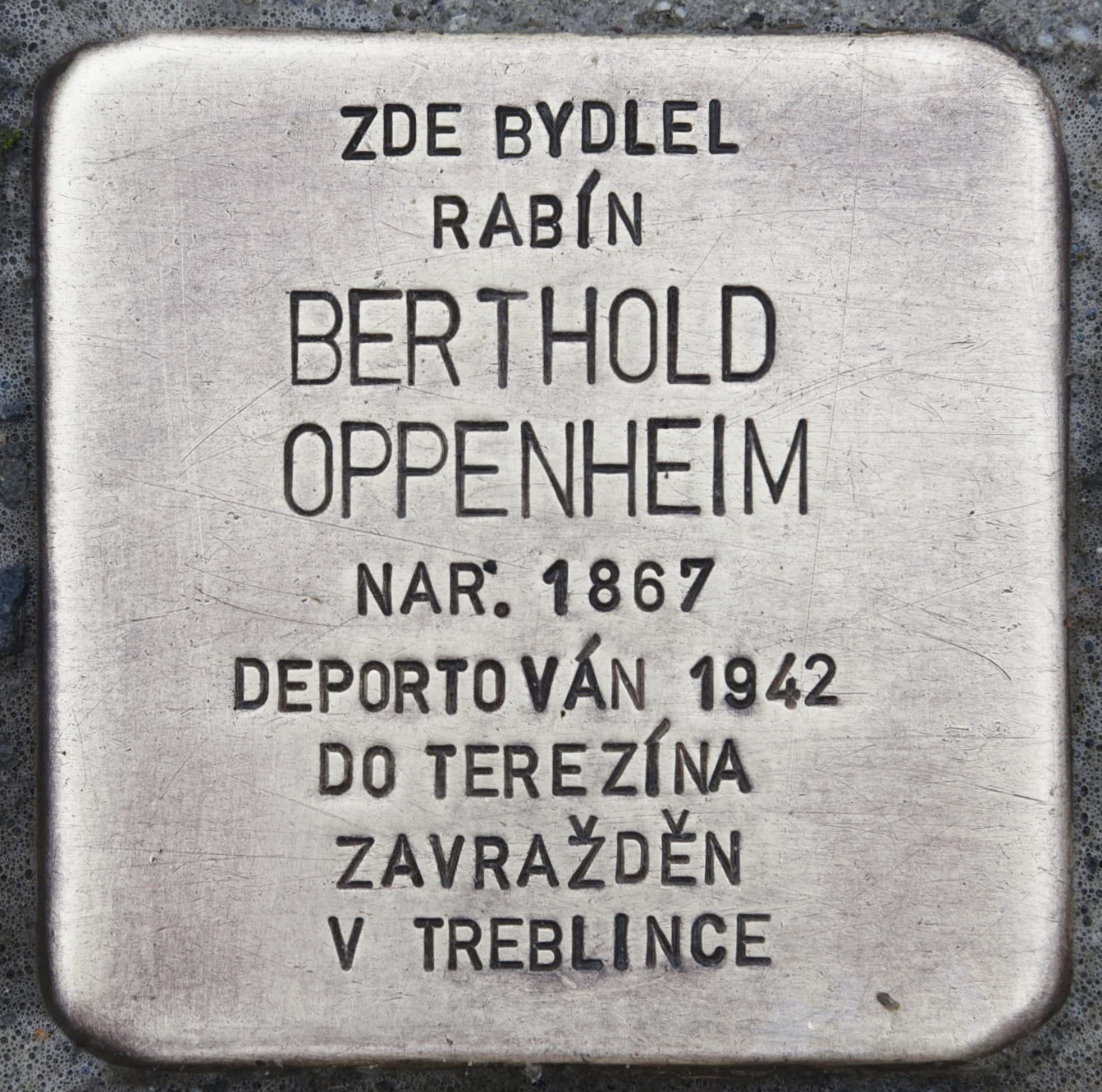
Stolperstein in Olomouc

On the 29 and 30 October 2012, 42 Stolpersteine were laid in Olomouc, including one for Oppenheim and his wife in front of the former building on the Avenue Třída Svobody 24 (later demolished), where he lived until his deportation. The Stolperstein carries the following text (shown here with English translation):

ZDE BYDLEL
RABÍN
BERTHOLD OPPENHEIM
NAR. 1867
DEPORTOVÁN 1942
DO TEREZÍNA
ZAVRAŽDĚN
V TREBLINCE

HERE RESIDED
RABBI
BERTHOLD OPPENHEIM
BORN 1867
DEPORTED IN 1942
TO THERESIENSTADT
MURDERED
IN TREBLINKA

== Articles ==
- Berthold Oppenheim, Geschichte der Juden in Olmütz, in: H. Gold (Hrsg.), Die Juden und Judengemeinden Mährens in Vergangenheit und Gegenwart. A collection, Jüdischer Buch- und Kunstverlag, Brünn 1929, pp. 451–456 (in German), downloadable free of charge at the Deutsche Nationalbibliothek (German National Library) by clicking on "Archivobjekt öffnen".

== Sources ==
- Vladimír Jorda: PhDr. Berthold Oppenheim, A biography written for the Jewish Community of Olomouc, online at:
