= Hanns Cibulka =

German poet and diarist

Hanns Cibulka (20 September 1920, in Jägerndorf, Czechoslovakia – 20 June 2004, in Gotha, Germany) was a German poet and diarist.

== Works ==
- 1954 Märzlicht. Gedichte
- 1959 Zwei Silben. Gedichte
- 1960 Sizilianisches Tagebuch
- 1962 Arioso. Gedichte
- 1963 Umbrische Tage
- 1968 Windrose. Gedichte
- 1971 Sanddornzeit. Tagebuchblätter von Hiddensee
- 1972 Dornburger Blätter. Briefe und Aufzeichnungen
- 1973 Lichtschwalben. Gedichte
- 1974 Liebeserklärung in K. Tagebuchaufzeichnungen
- 1977 Lebensbaum. Gedichte
- 1978 Das Buch Ruth. Aus den Aufzeichnungen des Archäologen Michael S.
- 1980 Der Rebstock. Gedichte
- 1982 Swantow. Die Aufzeichnungen des Andreas Flemming
- 1982 Gedichte
- 1984 Seit ein Gespräch wir sind / E noi siamo dialogo. Gedichte/Poesie
- 1985 Seedorn. Tagebucherzählung
- 1986 Losgesprochen. Gedichte aus 3 Jahrzehnten
- 1988 Wegscheide. Tagebucherzählung
- 1991 Ostseetagebücher
- 1992 Dornburger Blätter
- 1993 Thüringer Tagebücher
- 1994 Am Brückenwehr. Zwischen Kindheit und Wende
- 1996 Die Heimkehr der verratenen Söhne. Tagebucherzählung
- 1998 Tagebuch einer späten Liebe.
- 2000 Sonnenflecken über Pisa
- 2004 Späte Jahre
- 2005 Jedes Wort ein Flügelschlag (edited by Günter Gerstmann)
- 2005 Die blaue Farbe des Windes (ausgewählte Lyrik u. Prosa). Kunstband mit farbigen Zeichnungen Gudrun Kraft-Methfessel (Hg.) – Jena: Glaux. (Vertrieb) – ISBN 3-931743-87-X
