= Ivančice =

- Town
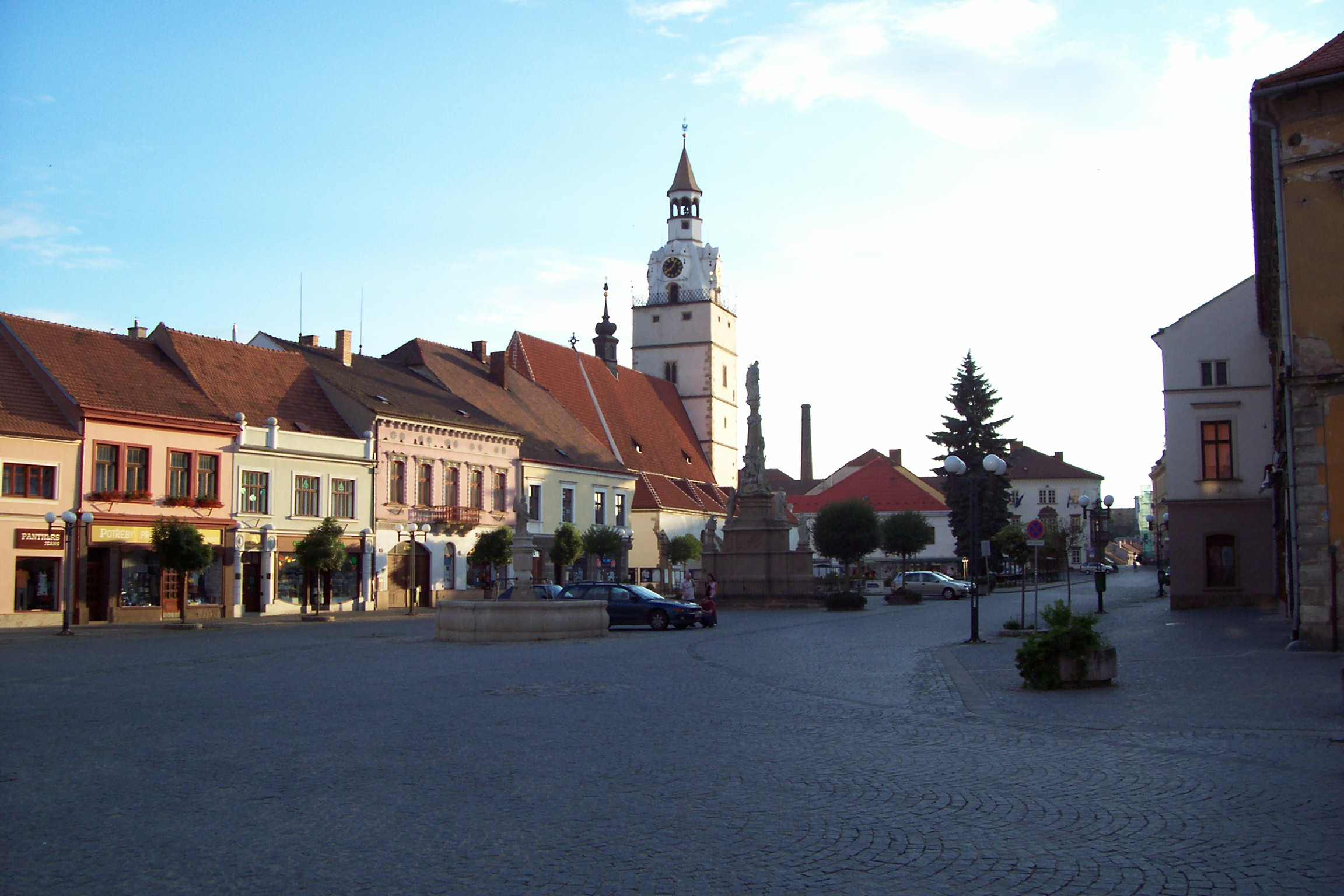
- The square Palackého náměstí

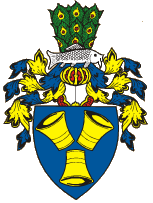
- Flag Coat of arms

- Location in the Czech Republic
- Coordinates: 49°6′5″N 16°22′39″E
- Country: Czech Republic
- Region: South Moravian
- District: Brno-Country
- First mentioned: 1212

Government
  - Mayor: Jaroslav Sojka

Area
  - Total: 47.65 km^{2} (18.40 sq mi)
- Elevation: 210 m (690 ft)

Population (2026-01-01)
  - Total: 9,905
  - Density: 207.9/km^{2} (538.4/sq mi)
- Time zone: UTC+1 (CET)
  - Summer (DST): UTC+2 (CEST)
- Postal code: 664 91
- Website: ivancice.cz

Ivančice (Czech pronunciation: [ˈɪvantʃɪtsɛ]; German: Eibenschütz) is a town in Brno-Country District in the South Moravian Region of the Czech Republic. It has about 9,900 inhabitants. The town is situated at the confluences of the Oslava, Jihlava and Rokytná rivers.

From the 17th century until World War II, Ivančice had a significant Jewish community. The historic town centre is well preserved and is protected as an urban monument zone. Ivančice is known as the birthplace of the painter Alphonse Mucha and the actor Vladimír Menšík.

== Administrative division ==
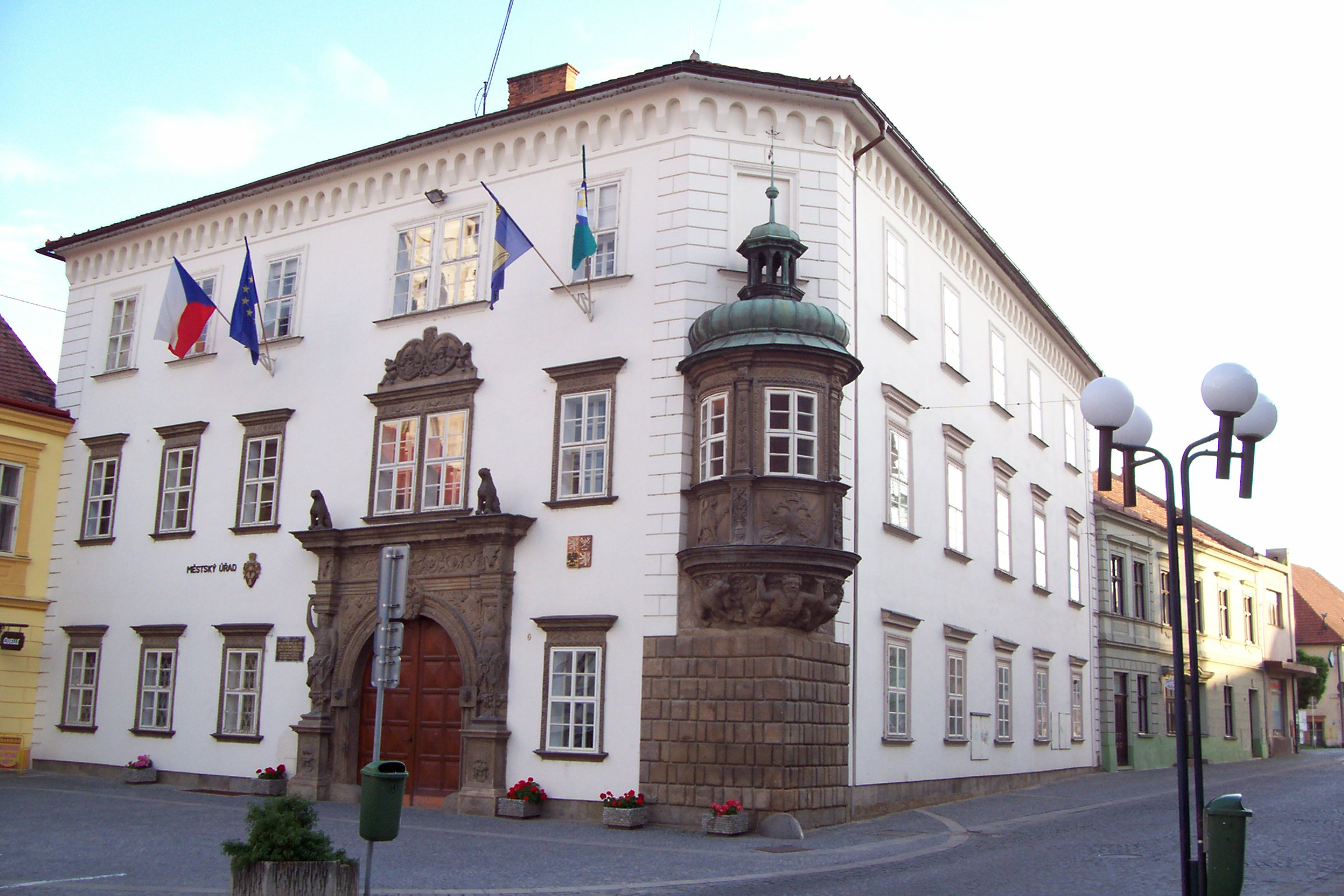
Town hall

Ivančice consists of seven municipal parts (in brackets population according to the 2021 census):

- Ivančice (6,924)
- Alexovice (535)
- Budkovice (319)
- Hrubšice (246)
- Letkovice (587)
- Němčice (741)
- Řeznovice (346)

== Etymology ==
The name Ivančice is derived from the personal name Ivanek (a pet form of Ivan), meaning "the village of Ivanek's people".

== Geography ==
Ivančice is located about 18 kilometres (11 mi) southwest of Brno. It lies in the Boskovice Furrow. The highest point is at 409 m (1,342 ft) above sea level. The town is situated at the confluences of the Oslava, Jihlava and Rokytná rivers.

== History ==
The first written mention of Ivančice is from 1212. In 1288, it became a royal town of King Wenceslaus II. In 1304, the town was burned down by the Cumans. In 1424–1435, the town was occupied by the Hussites. Ivančice ceased to be a royal town in 1486, when it was acquired by the Pernštejn family and later by the Lords of Lipá.

In the 16th century, Ivančice became the centre of Moravian education thanks to the Unity of the Brethren. The town prospered until the Thirty Years' War, when it was looted by the troops of Gabriel Bethlen and later occupied by the Swedish army. The war was followed by a plague epidemic and many houses remained desolate. However, the town slowly managed to recover.

=== Jewish community ===
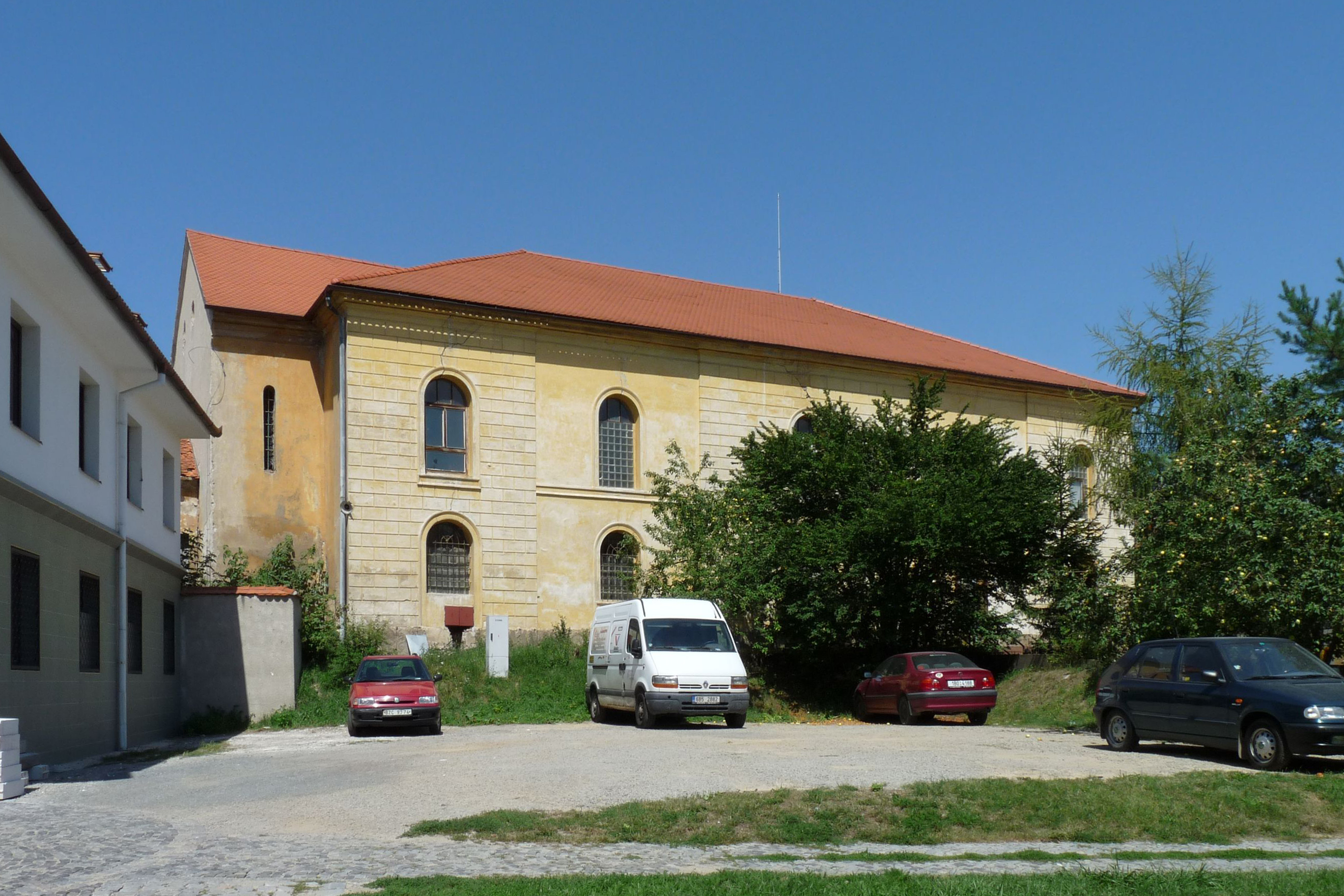
Synagogue

A Jewish ghetto was established maybe already in the 13th century, and was one of the oldest and most important in Moravia. The first written mention of the community is from 1454, when the refugees from Brno came here. The community was placed outside the town proper. Later it was moved inside the town walls but administered as an independent municipality, with its own Jewish mayor.

The reign of King Ferdinand I in the early 16th century placed economic restrictions on the Jews of Ivančice. The Counter Reformation and the Thirty Years' War reduced the number of Protestants living in Ivančice, and at the same time, the Jewish community grew thanks to the arrival of refugees from Bohemia. This growth resulted in an edict issued in 1650 forbidding any Jews to inhabit Moravia who had not resided there before 1618. A formal Jewish community was established during the 17th century.

The Jewish population was at its peak in 1835, when there lived 877 Jews. In the first half of the 19th century, the community formed around 25% of the town's population. After the revolution in 1848, Jews gained full civil rights. Between 1849 and 1919, there was a self-governing Jewish political community in Ivančice. After the proclamation of an independent Czechoslovakia and the end of World War I, it was merged with the Christian rest of the town, however, the community continued its activities. The community disappeared as a result of the Holocaust during World War II.

== Demographics ==
Historical population

Year	Pop.	±%
1869	6,796	—
1880	6,513	−4.2%
1890	6,989	+7.3%
1900	7,265	+3.9%
1910	7,777	+7.0%

Year	Pop.	±%
1921	7,999	+2.9%
1930	8,513	+6.4%
1950	8,040	−5.6%
1961	8,154	+1.4%
1970	8,558	+5.0%

Year	Pop.	±%
1980	9,746	+13.9%
1991	9,448	−3.1%
2001	9,350	−1.0%
2011	9,468	+1.3%
2021	9,698	+2.4%

Source: Censuses

== Transport ==
Ivančice is connected by a short railway line with Moravské Bránice, from where another line continues to Brno. There are three train stations and stops in Ivančice.

== Sights ==
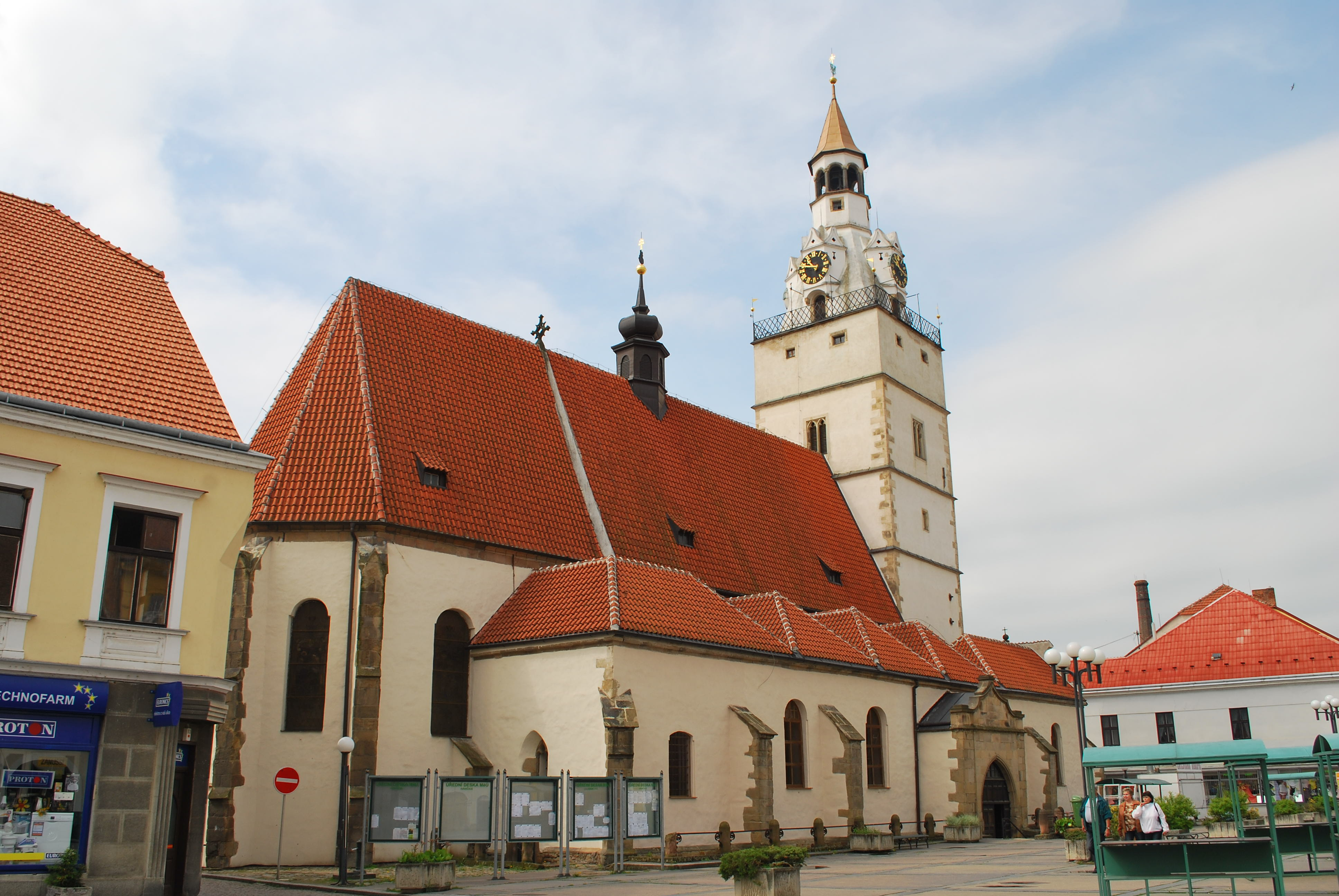
Church of the Assumption of the Virgin Mary

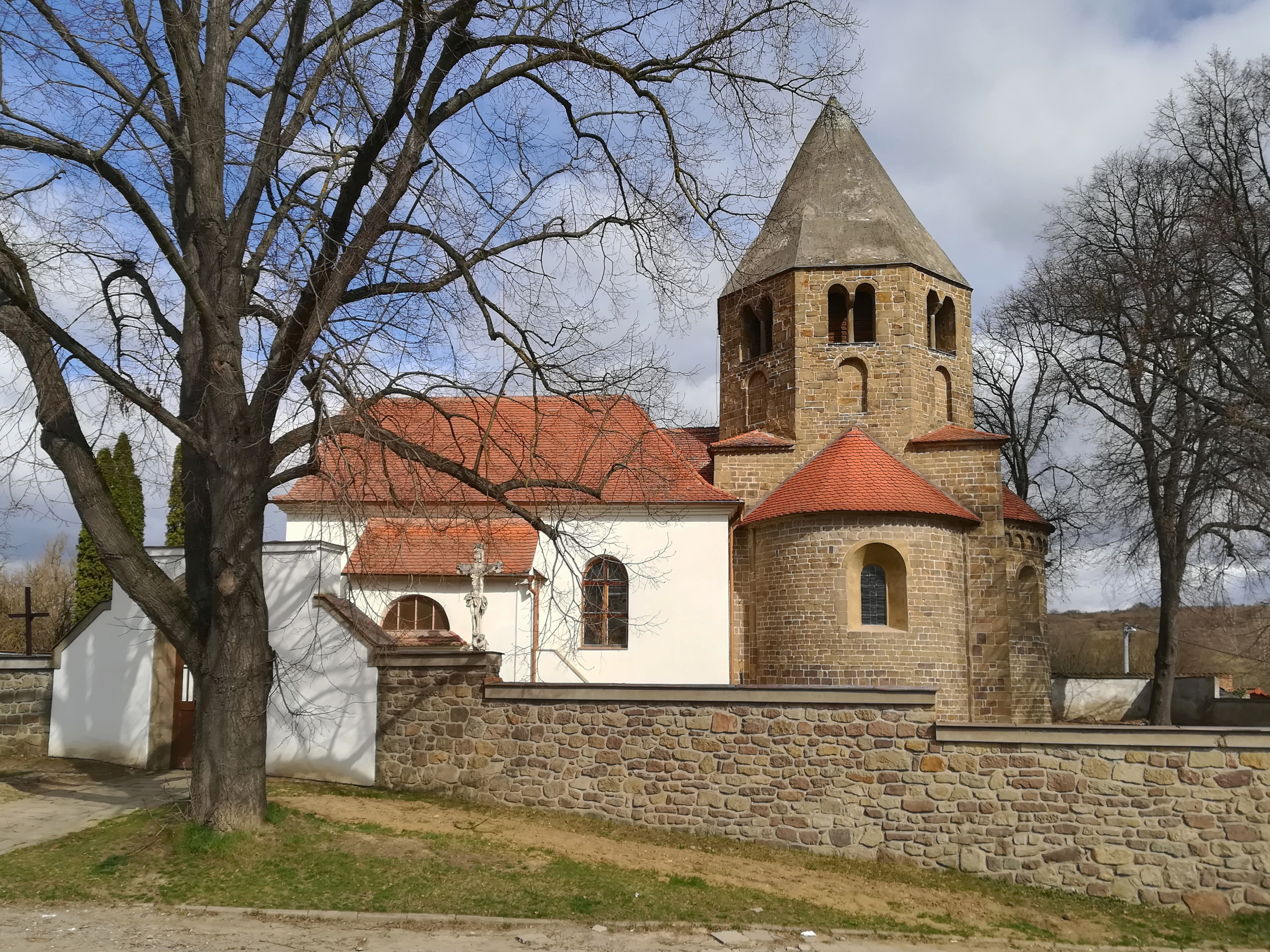
Church of Saints Peter and Paul

The main landmark of the central town square is the Church of the Assumption of the Virgin Mary. It is a Gothic building with a prismatic tower. In the middle of the square is Marian column from 1726 and a fountain with a statue of Saint Florian.

The Renaissance building of the Old Town Hall from 1544 houses a museum with Monument of Alphonse Mucha, who was born right here. The museum also has an exhibition on life and work of actor Vladimír Menšík, another famous native. The former residence of Lords of Lipá is another sight of the town square. Today it serves as a town hall.

The Church of Saints Peter and Paul in Řeznovice is the most valuable monument of the town. It is a Romanesque structure from the first half of the 12th century.

The Jewish Quarter has an area of 2.75 hectares (7 acres) and consisted of 83 houses, out of which 45 are preserved to this day. The synagogue was built in the Empire style in 1851–1853. It replaced an old synagogue first mentioned in 1613. The synagogue served its purpose until 1942. After the World War II, it was used as a warehouse, and today it is converted into a library and cultural centre.

In Ivančice is a large Jewish cemetery with Gothic and Renaissance tombs. It is the third oldest Jewish cemetery in the country. It was probably founded in the second half of the 15th century. The oldest preserved tombstone comes from 1548, 1552 or 1580. There is also the ceremonial hall built in 1902–1903. It contains a small museum exhibition on the history and monuments of the local Jewish community.

A technical monument is the railway viaduct over the Jihlava River from 1870, which is 42 m (138 ft) high.

== Notable people ==
- Jan Blahoslav (1523–1571), humanistic writer; lived here
- Christian Entfelder (1526–1544), anabaptist
- Joachim Oppenheim (1832–1891), writer and rabbi
- Guido Adler (1855–1941), musicologist
- Alphonse Mucha (1860–1939), painter
- Berthold Oppenheim (1867–1942), rabbi
- Hugo Weisgall (1912–1997), composer
- Zdeněk Růžička (1925–2021), gymnast
- Vladimír Menšík (1929–1988), actor
- Jan Procházka (1929–1971), writer and film director
- Vojtěch Adam (1950–2026), politician, mayor of Ivančice in 2002–2014
- Karel Večeřa (born 1955), football player and manager
- Robert Plaga (born 1978), politician and university teacher
- Tereza Fajksová (born 1989), Miss Earth 2012
- Patrik Auda (born 1989), basketball player
- Barbora Krejčíková (born 1995), tennis player
- Adam Hložek (born 2002), footballer

== Twin towns – sister cities ==
Ivančice is twinned with:

- Radovljica, Slovenia
- Sládkovičovo, Slovakia
- Soyaux, France
- Stupava, Slovakia
