= Vojtěch Adam =

Czech politician (1950–2026)

Vojtěch Adam MP
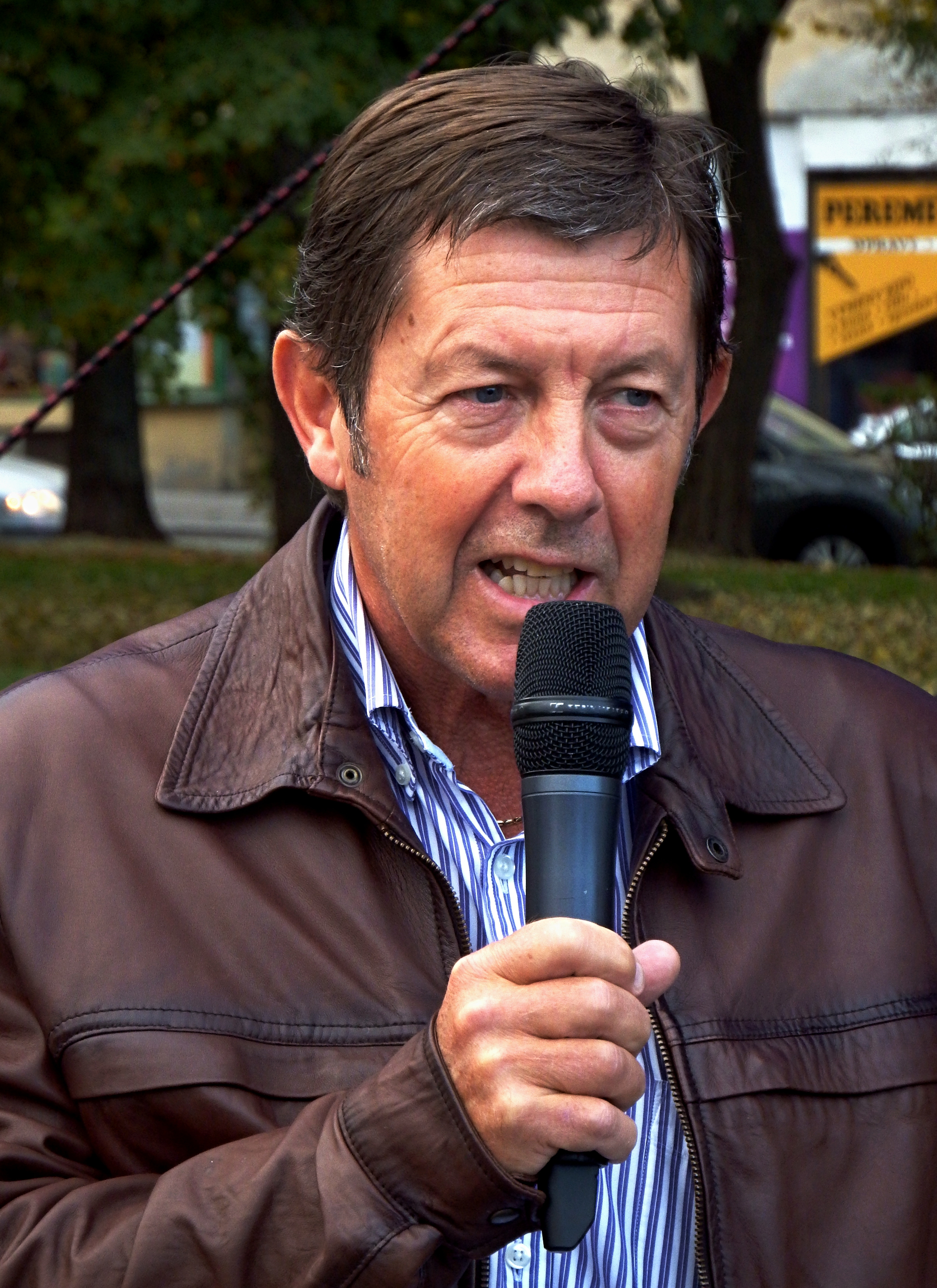
- Adam in 2013

Member of Parliament for South Moravian Region
- In office 25 October 2008 – 26 October 2017

Personal details
- Born: 12 September 1950 Ivančice, Czechoslovakia
- Died: 10 April 2026 (aged 75)
- Party: KSČ (1976–1992); Independent (nominated by ČSSD) (1994–1998); Independent (nominated by KSČM) (2002–2018)
- Education: Masaryk University

Vojtěch Adam (12 September 1950 – 10 April 2026) was a Czech politician. He was a member of the Chamber of Deputies of the Czech Republic from 2008 to 2017, representing South Moravian Region for the Communist Party of Bohemia and Moravia.

== Life and career ==
Adam was born on 12 September 1950 in Ivančice. Before 1989, he was the director of the Ivančice Hospital. Until 2002, he worked in the hospital as a surgeon. From 2002 to 2014, he was mayor of Ivančice. He served as a member of Committee on Health Care and a member of the Committee on Public Administration and Regional Development from December 2013 until his death on 10 April 2026, at the age of 75.
