= Krnov Synagogue =

Synagogue in Krnov, Czech Republic

- Czech: Synagoga v Krnově
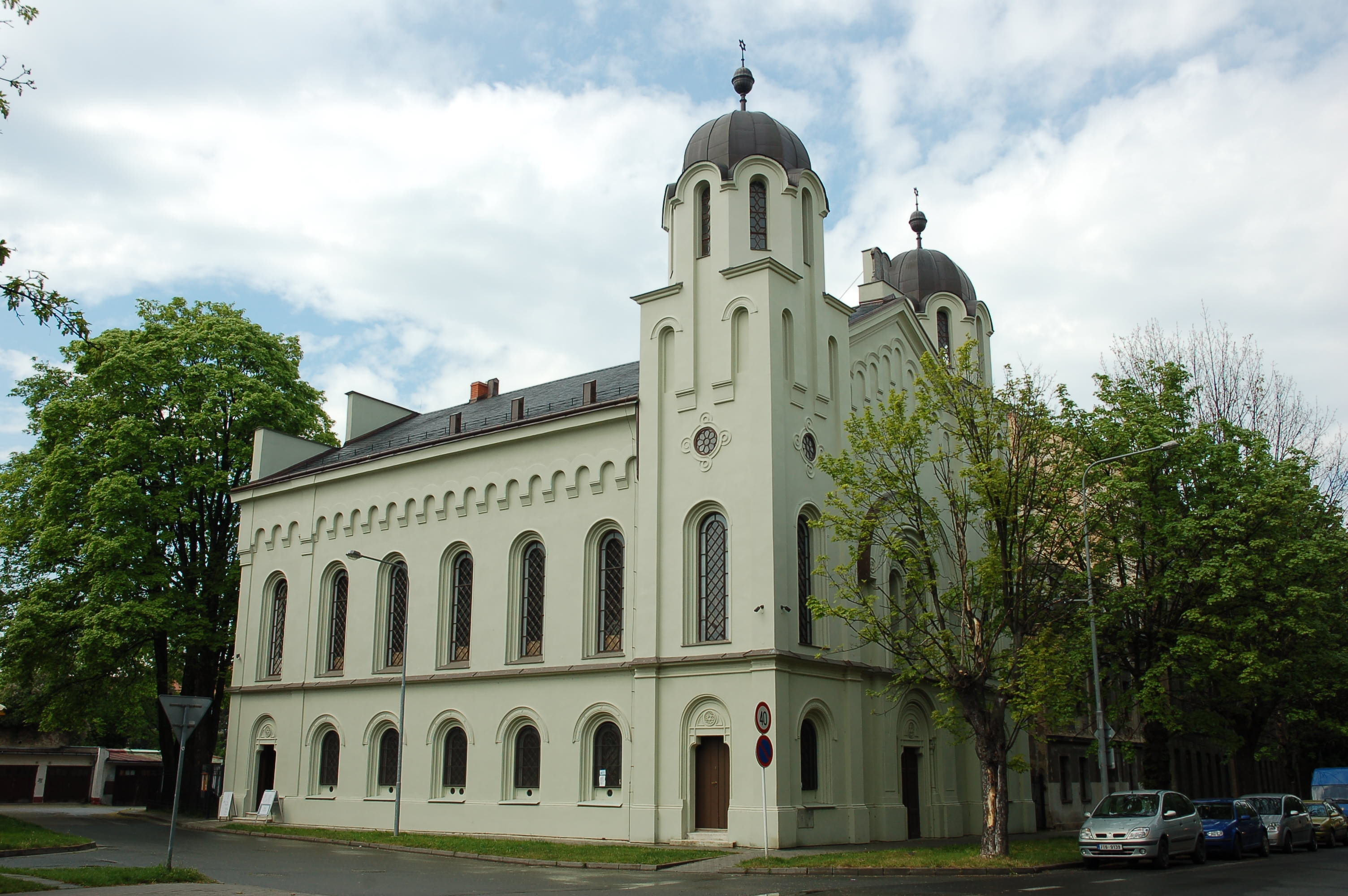
- The former synagogue, now museum, in 2015

- Location of the former synagogue, now museum, in the Czech Republic

Religion
- Affiliation: Judaism (former)
- Rite: Nusach Ashkenaz
- Ecclesiastical or organizational status: Synagogue (1871–1938); Jewish museum (since 2003)
- Status: Closed (as a synagogue); Repurposed

Location
- Location: Soukenická Street 83, Krnov
- Country: Czech Republic
- Interactive map of Krnov Synagogue
- Coordinates: 50°05′23″N 17°42′27″E

Architecture
- Architect: Ernst Latzel
- Type: Synagogue architecture
- Style: Rundbogenstil (exterior); Moorish Revival (interior)
- Established: 1848 (as a congregation)
- Completed: 1871
- Construction cost: Fl.26,000

Specifications
- Length: 24 metres (79 ft)
- Height (max): 22 metres (72 ft)
- Dome: Two
- Spire: Two
- Spire height: 22 metres (72 ft)
- Materials: Copper

The Krnov Synagogue (Czech: Synagoga v Krnově) is a former Jewish synagogue, located on Soukenická Street in Krnov, in the Czech Republic. Completed in 1871, the former synagogue is one of only three surviving synagogue buildings in the Moravian-Silesian Region (the others are at Nový Jičín and Český Těšín).

Whilst the synagogue building remains, since 2003 it has been used as an exhibition and concert hall and was substantially restored by 2014.

== History ==
The first recorded settlement of Jews in Krnov was in the 14th century. Jews were expelled from the town during the reign of Georg Hohenzollern. A small number of Jewish families returned during the 17th and 18th century, and they required a special permit in order to live in the town. The Jewish community was restored in 1848. The congregation constructed the synagogue in 1871.

The exterior of the building with twin towers and round-arched windows is in an eclectic, round-arched, Rundbogenstil Romanesque Revival style. The interior is Moorish Revival, especially the wooden carved coffered ceiling (painted in reddish brown) and the arcade of the women's galleries.

=== During World War II ===
The Krnov Synagogue ceased to be used for religious services in the autumn of 1938, when the Sudetenland was incorporated into Nazi Germany. Not long afterwards, on 9 November 1938, almost all synagogues in the surrounding towns – as anywhere in Nazi Germany – were destroyed during the Reichskristallnacht prosecution.

In late October 1938, the mayor of Krnov, Oskar König, received a secret order from Berlin to destroy and burn down the Krnov Synagogue on 9 November. Unwilling to comply, König summoned a meeting of the councillors and informed them about the order received. The Sudeten councillors unanimously accepted a proposal from Franz Irblich, a local builder, to remove all symbols of the Jewish religion from the building and change it into a town market hall, reporting to Berlin that there was no synagogue in Jägerndorf which could be destroyed. The synagogue was saved and used until the end of World War II in 1945.

=== After World War II ===
The German population of Krnov was expelled after the war and the former synagogue building was used first as a warehouse, then as a regional archive. The building was damaged during the 1997 Central European flood and, in 1999, the building was returned to the Jewish community. However, as there was no Jewish community in Krnov, the Olomouc community accepted ownership. Between 2003 and 2014 the building was thoroughly renovated. Pews from the former synagogue in Olomouc and from the former Protestant Church in Krnov have been restored and are located in the former synagogue.

Franz Irblich is considered by the Czech town of Krnov as a savior of the synagogue. In 1946, Irblich received a ten-year sentence by a Czechoslovak extraordinary court after accusations of being a Nazi.

== Gallery ==
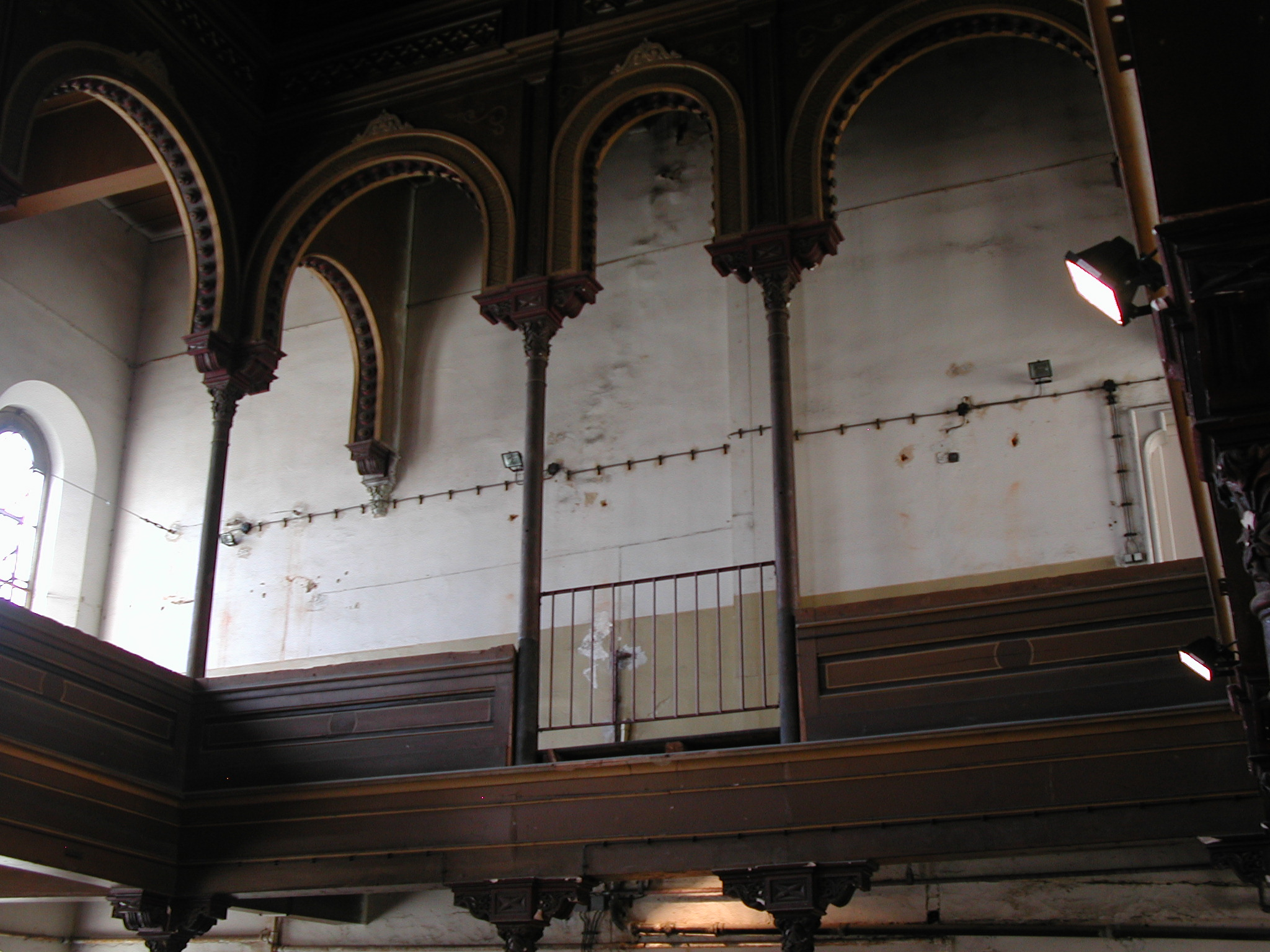
The gallery

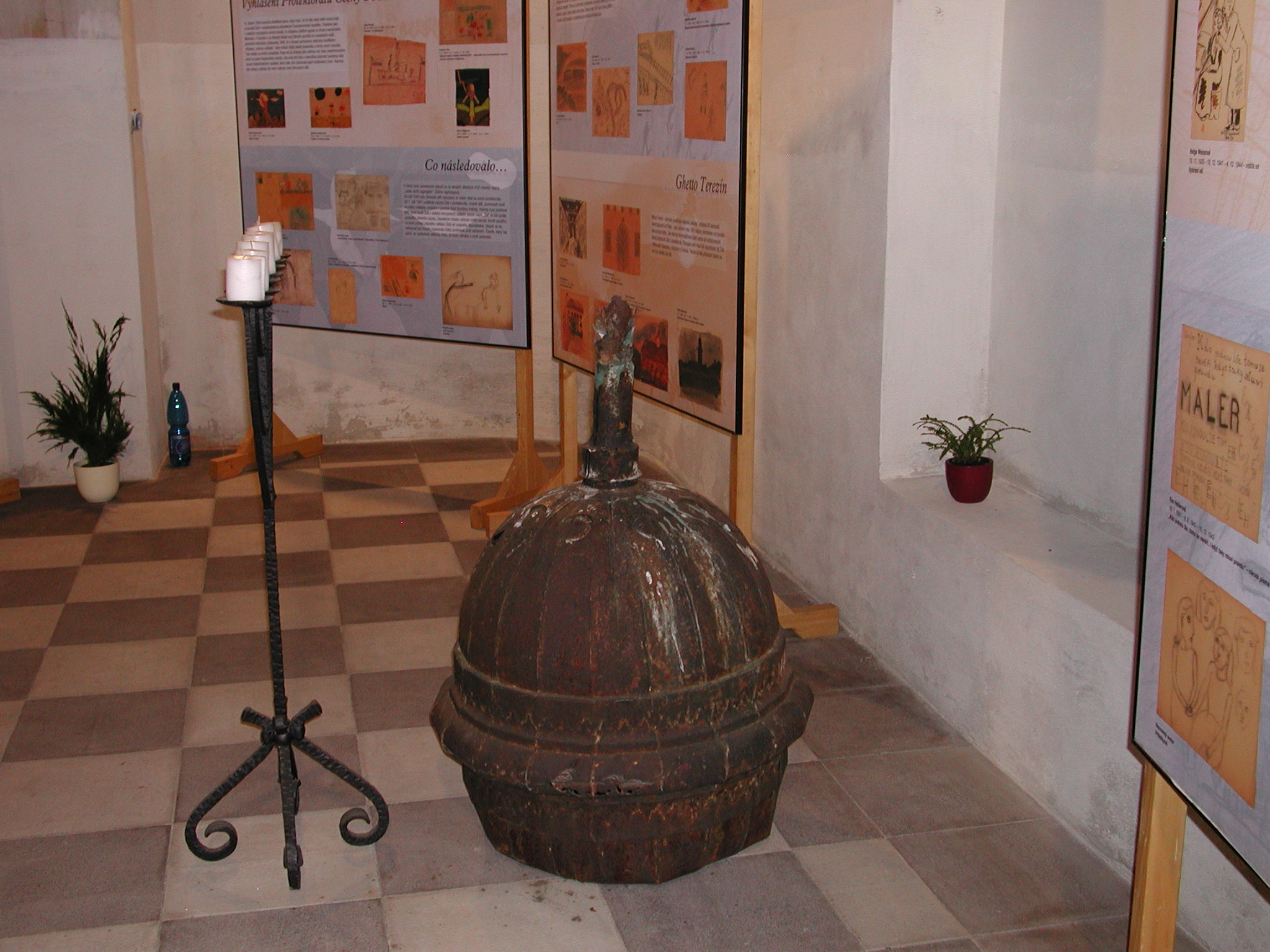
Old Copper Dome. The copper domes have been replaced

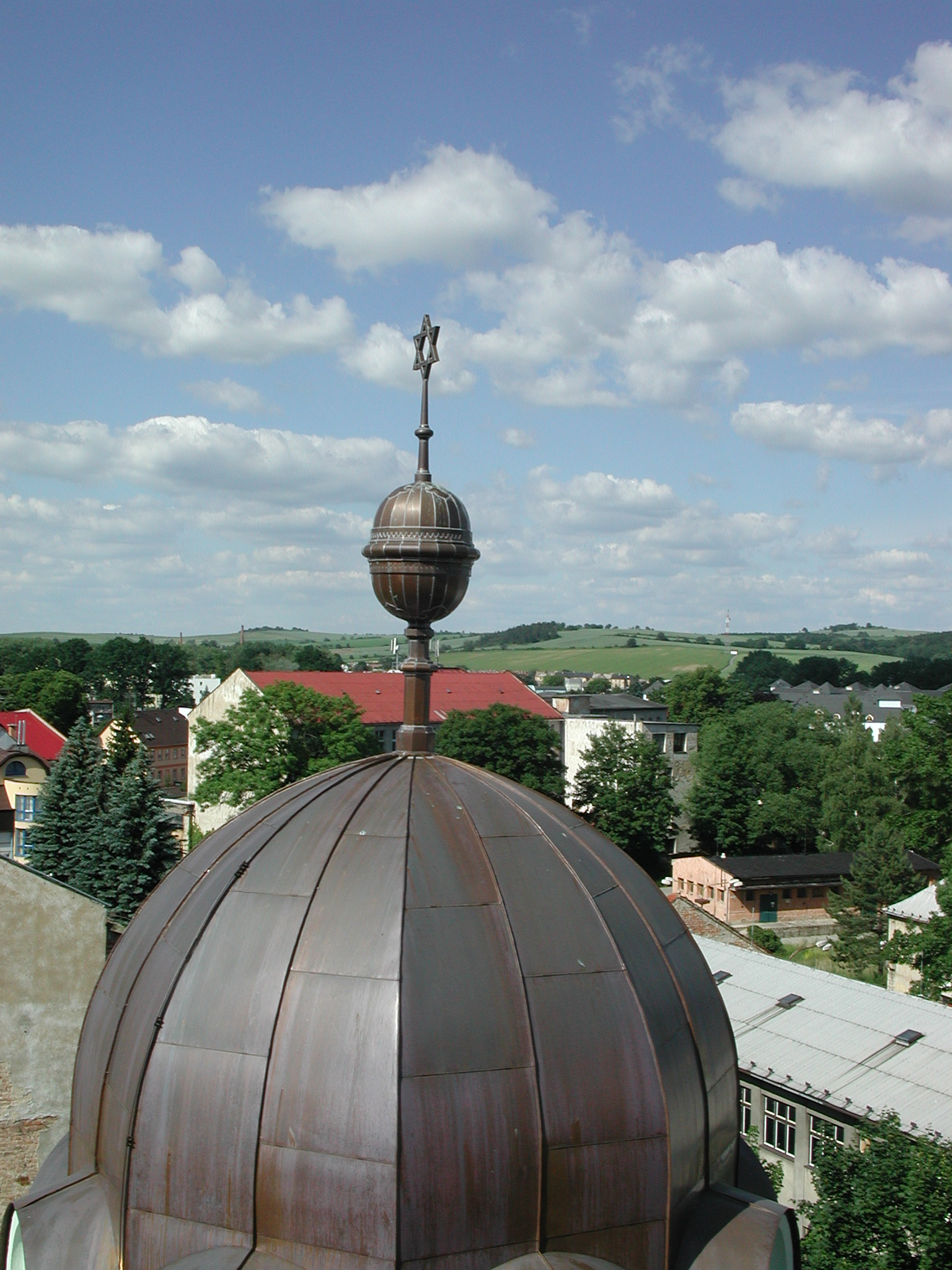
View from scaffolding erected while the synagogue was being restored

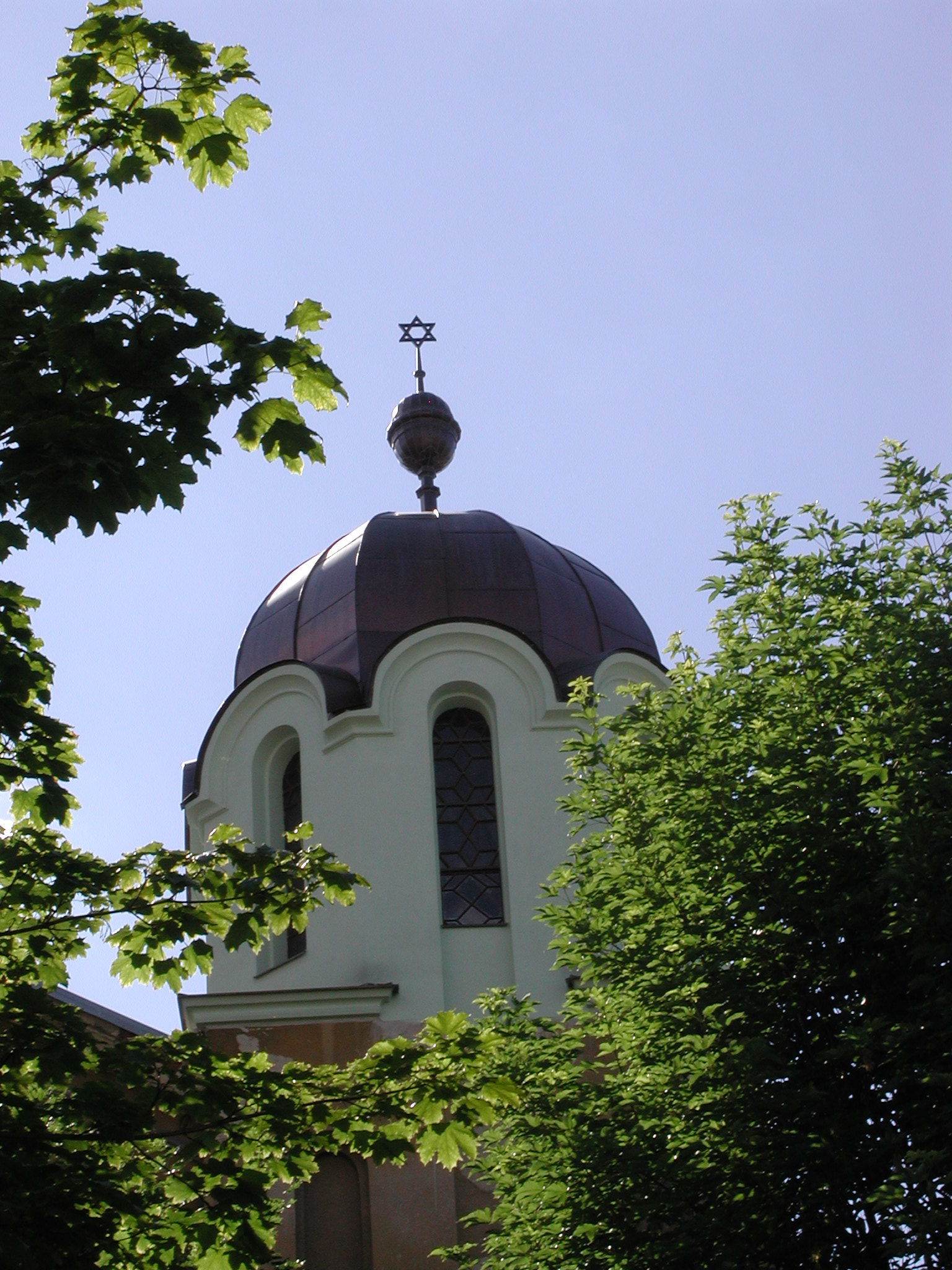
One of the towers

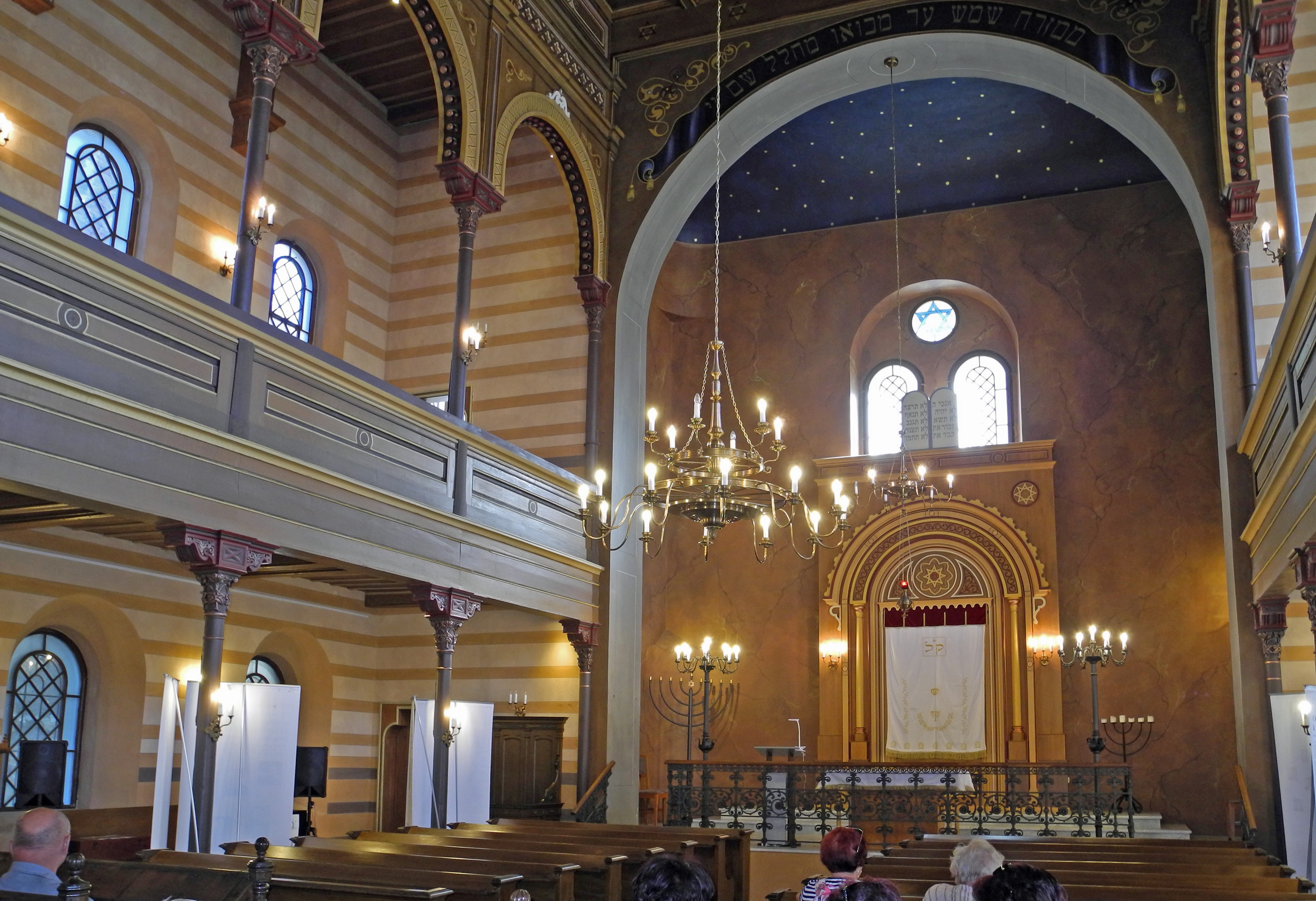
Interior of the synagogue

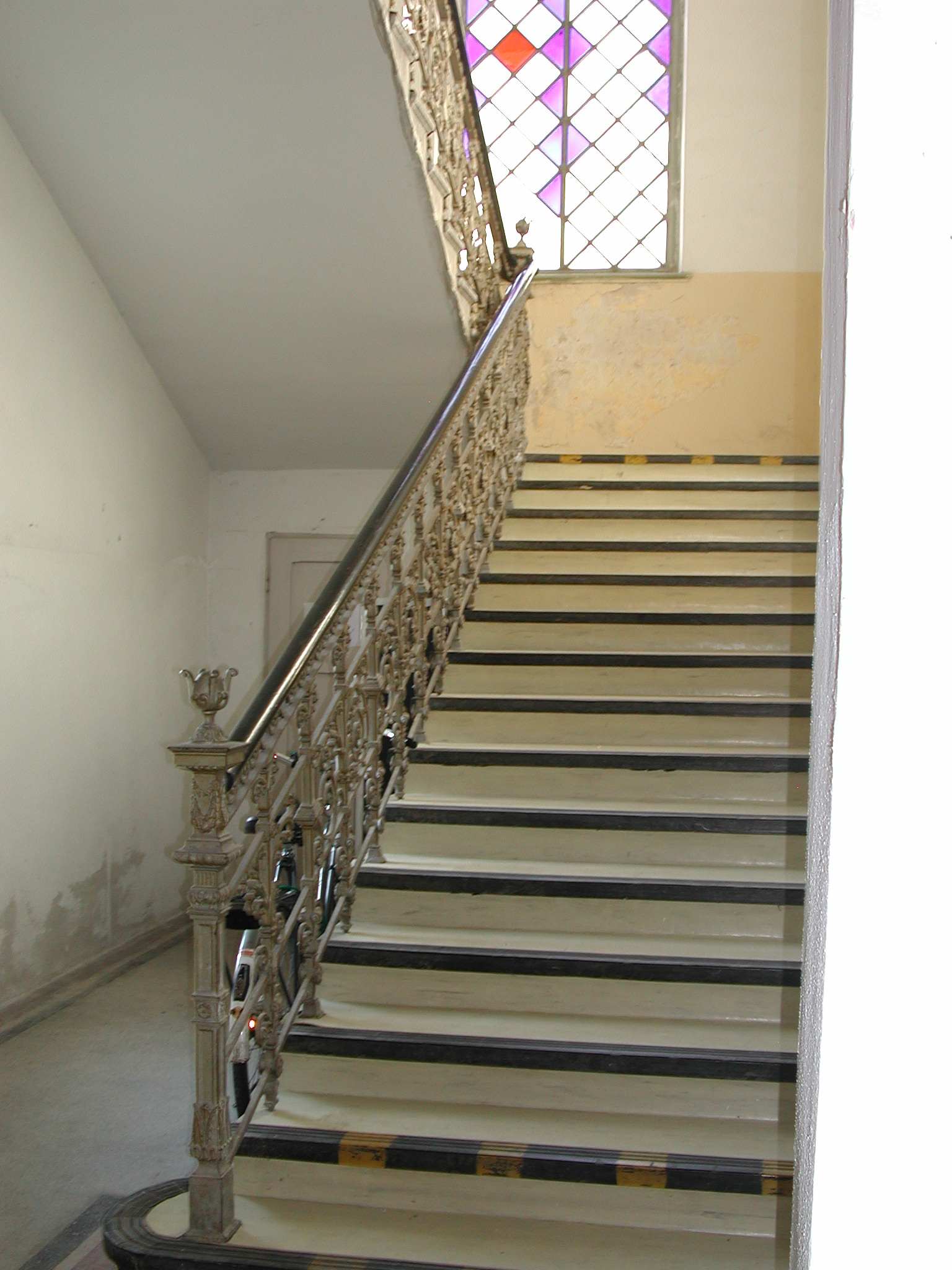
Stairs leading to the gallery

== See also ==
- History of the Jews in the Czech Republic
- Olomouc Synagogue
