= Krnov =

Town in the Czech Republic

- Town
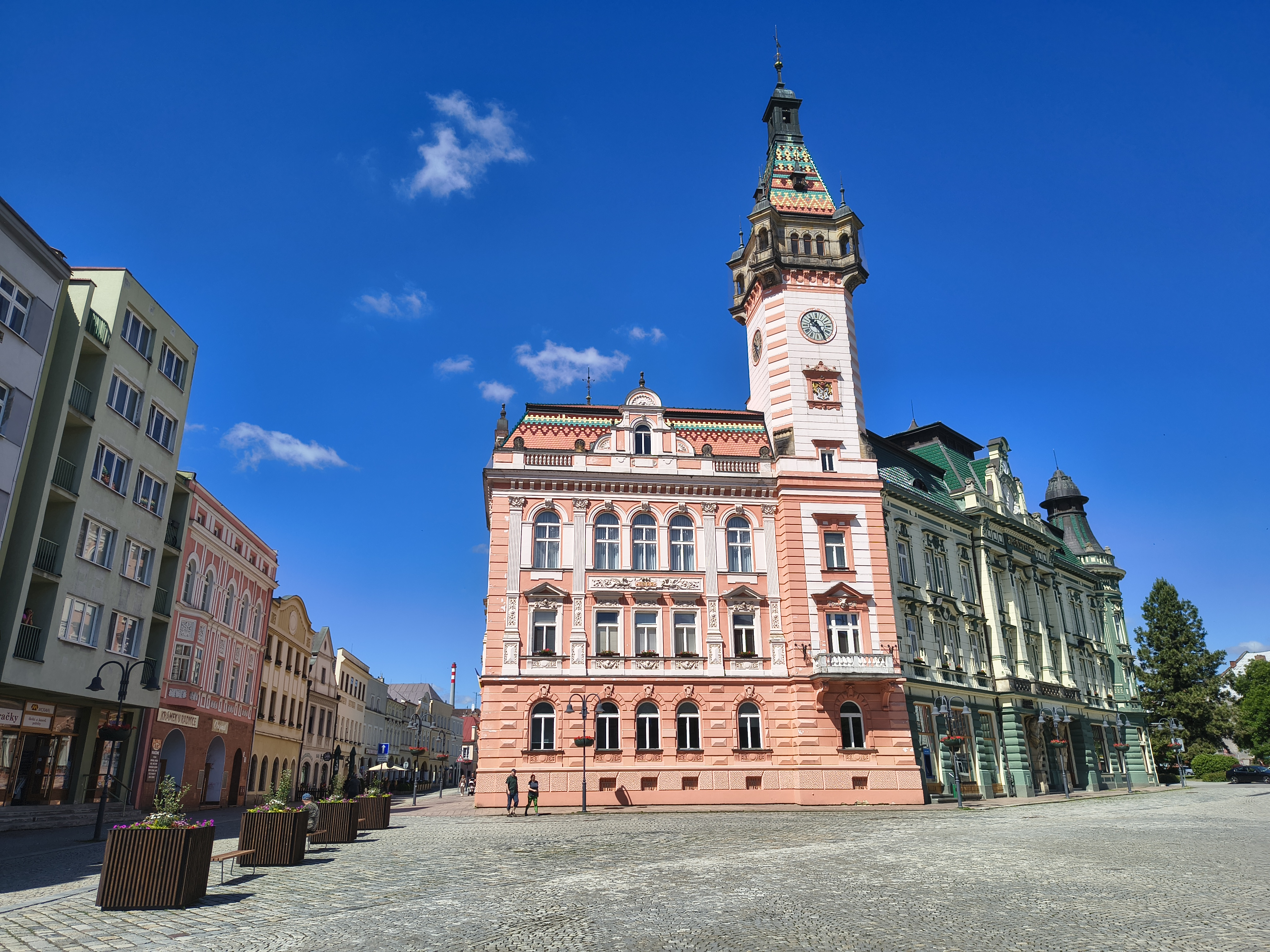
- Town square with the town hall

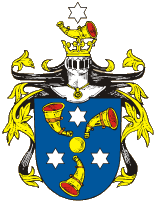
- Flag Coat of arms

- Location in the Czech Republic
- Coordinates: 50°5′26″N 17°41′55″E
- Country: Czech Republic
- Region: Moravian-Silesian
- District: Bruntál
- First mentioned: 1240

Government
  - Mayor: Monika Bala Dudová (ANO)

Area
  - Total: 44.29 km^{2} (17.10 sq mi)
- Elevation: 316 m (1,037 ft)

Population (2026-01-01)
  - Total: 22,303
  - Density: 503.6/km^{2} (1,304/sq mi)
- Time zone: UTC+1 (CET)
  - Summer (DST): UTC+2 (CEST)
- Postal code: 794 01
- Website: www.krnov.cz

Krnov (Czech pronunciation: [ˈkr̩nof]; German: Jägerndorf, Polish: Karniów or Krnów) is a town in Bruntál District in the Moravian-Silesian Region of the Czech Republic. It has about 22,000 inhabitants. The town is situated on the border with Poland, at the confluence of the Opava and Opavice rivers.

Krnov became a town in the mid-13th century and from 1377, it was the centre of the Duchy of Krnov. The greatest development of the town occurred during the rule of the Hohenzollern family in the 16th century. In the 19th century, Krnov was industrialised and became known for its textile industry and production of pipe organs. Today the town is known for the production of the cola-based drink Kofola.

The most valuable monuments of Krnov, protected as national cultural monuments, are the former cotton mill and the pilgrimage site on the Cvilín hill. Notable landmarks of Krnov also include the Neo-Renaissance town hall, the Church of Saint Martin and the Krnov Synagogue.

== Administrative division ==
Krnov consists of three municipal parts (in brackets population according to the 2021 census):

- Pod Bezručovým vrchem (14,445)
- Pod Cvilínem (7,099)
- Krásné Loučky (573)

== Geography ==
Krnov is located about 21 kilometres (13 mi) northwest of Opava and 49 km (30 mi) northwest of Ostrava, in the historic region of Czech Silesia on the border with Poland. The town is situated at the confluence of the Opava and Opavice rivers.

The northern part of the territory with the town proper lies in the Zlatohorská Highlands. The western and the southern part lie in the Nízký Jeseník range. A small part on the southeast extends into the Opava Hilly Land. The highest point is the hill Bednářský vrch at 588 m (1,929 ft) above sea level.

== History ==
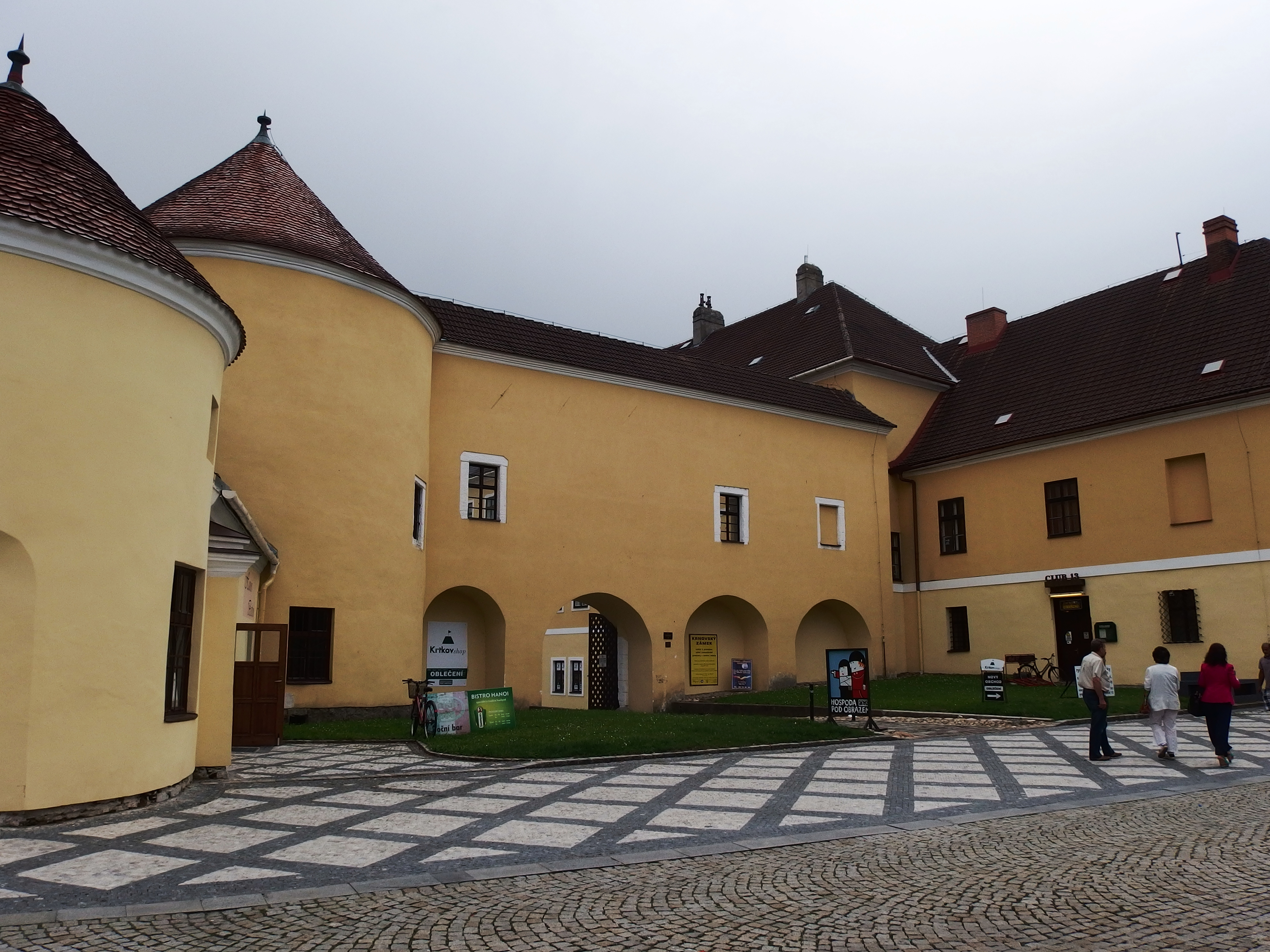
Krnov Castle

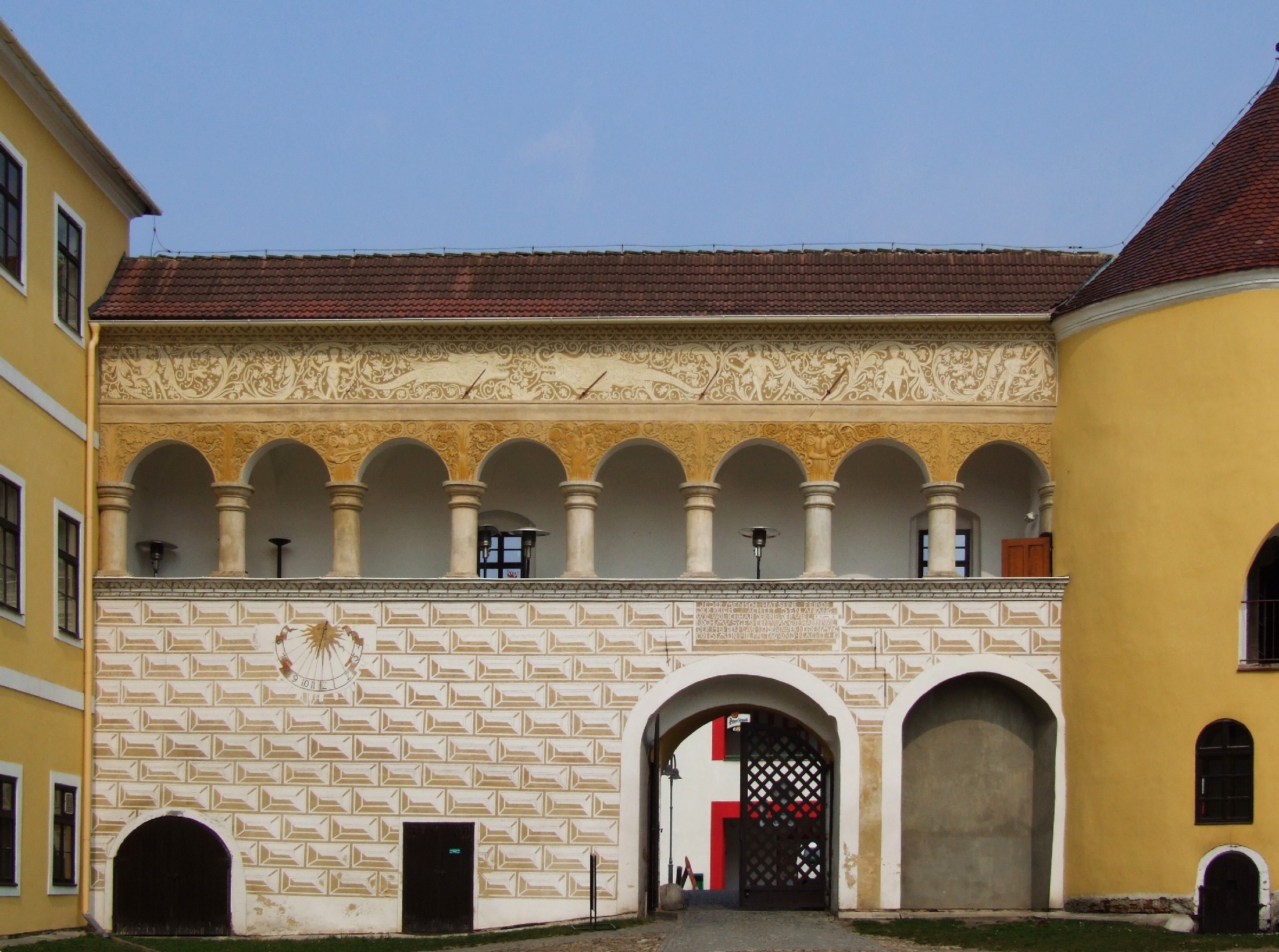
Krnov Castle courtyard

The first written mention of Krnov is from 1240. At the latest in 1269 and probably already in 1253, Krnov was a town. In the second half of the 13th century, town fortifications were built. In 1273, the Minorites came into the town and established a monastery.

Krnov was a part of Duchy of Troppau until 1377, when the Duchy of Krnov separated and the town became its capital. Krnov prospered, guilds were established and textile crafts developed. In 1523, the Duchy of Krnov was acquired by the Hohenzollern family. They had built a castle here and during their rule, the town achieved its greatest prosperity and population growth.

The prosperity ended with the Thirty Years' War. The battles caused the town to decline and subsequently stagnate. After the war, the duchy was acquired by the Liechtenstein family who began the re-Catholicisation of the entire duchy. In the 17th and 18th centuries, the town stagnated economically, but several Baroque monuments were created here. After the War of the Austrian Succession, Krnov became a border town. In 1779, a large fire destroyed almost the entire town.

The development of the town was restored by the industrial revolution in the 19th century. Textile factories began to be established, and within a few decades Krnov more than doubled its population. The railway, which was opened in 1872, also helped the development.

According to the Austrian census of 1910, the town had 16,681 inhabitants. The census had asked people for their native language; 15,390 (98.4%) were German-speaking and 247 (1.5%) were Czech-speaking. Jews were not allowed to declare Yiddish, thus most of them declared German as their native language. The most populous religious groups were Roman Catholics with 15,290 (91.7%), followed by Protestants with 885 (5.3%) and Jews with 459 (2.8%).

From 1938 to 1945 it was occupied by Germany and administered as a part of the Reichsgau Sudetenland. During World War II, the German administration operated a Gestapo prison and four forced labour subcamps of the Stalag VIII-B/344 prisoner-of-war camp in the town. After the war, the German population was expelled, in accordance to the Potsdam Agreement.

In 2024, Krnov was damaged by the Central European floods.

== Demographics ==
In 1948, refugees from Greece fleeing as a result of the Greek Civil War came into Czechoslovakia, and in Krnov and its surroundings they formed a significant community. They successfully assimilated, and although most of them returned to their homeland after 1975, several hundred of them still remain.

Historical population

Year	Pop.	±%
1869	10,644	—
1880	14,247	+33.9%
1890	17,502	+22.8%
1900	18,399	+5.1%
1910	20,909	+13.6%

Year	Pop.	±%
1921	21,648	+3.5%
1930	24,075	+11.2%
1950	18,956	−21.3%
1961	21,493	+13.4%
1970	22,643	+5.4%

Year	Pop.	±%
1980	25,463	+12.5%
1991	25,436	−0.1%
2001	25,764	+1.3%
2011	24,008	−6.8%
2021	22,117	−7.9%

Source: Censuses

== Economy ==
Krnov is known for the production of cola-based drink Kofola. It is produced by the eponymous company, which is the largest industrial employer based in the town.

One of the largest local companies was Rieger–Kloss, which manufactured pipe organs. It was founded in 1873 and production has continued to the present, but after financial problems, it went into insolvency in 2018 and production was stopped.

== Transport ==
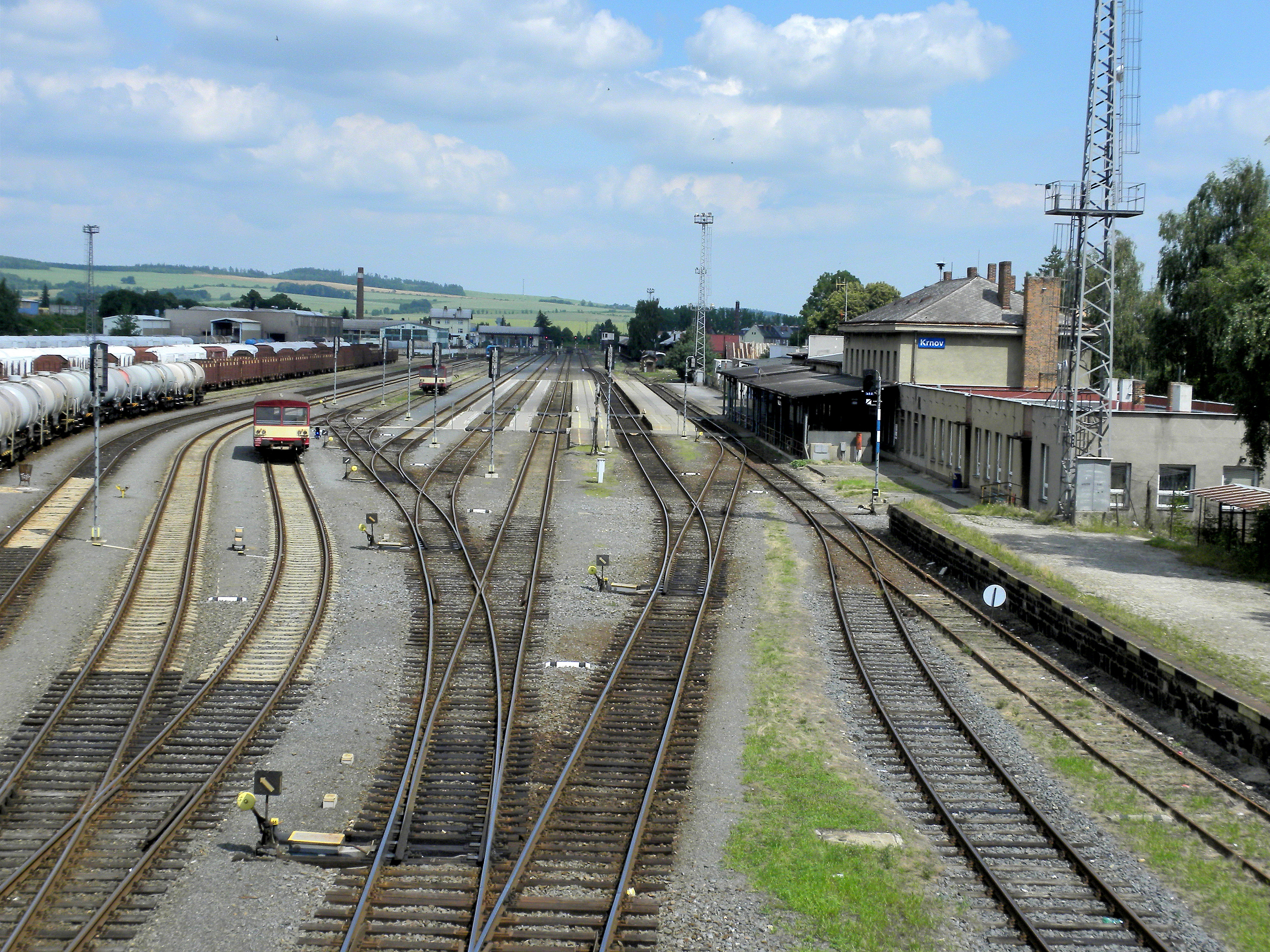
Krnov train station

Krnov is located on the Ostrava–Olomouc and Krnov–Jeseník (via Głuchołazy) railway lines. The town is served by two railway stations, Krnov and Krnov-Cvilín.

The road border crossings Krnov-Horní Předměstí / Ciermięcice, Krnov / Pietrowice, and Chomýž / Chomiąża are located in the municipal territory.

== Culture ==
Mír 70 Cinema in Krnov is able to screen 70 mm films, which is a rarity within Europe. Since 2006, the cinema hosts the annual Krrr! festival, which screens selected 70 mm films. The name of the festival refers to the name of the town and the sound of the projector.

== Sights ==
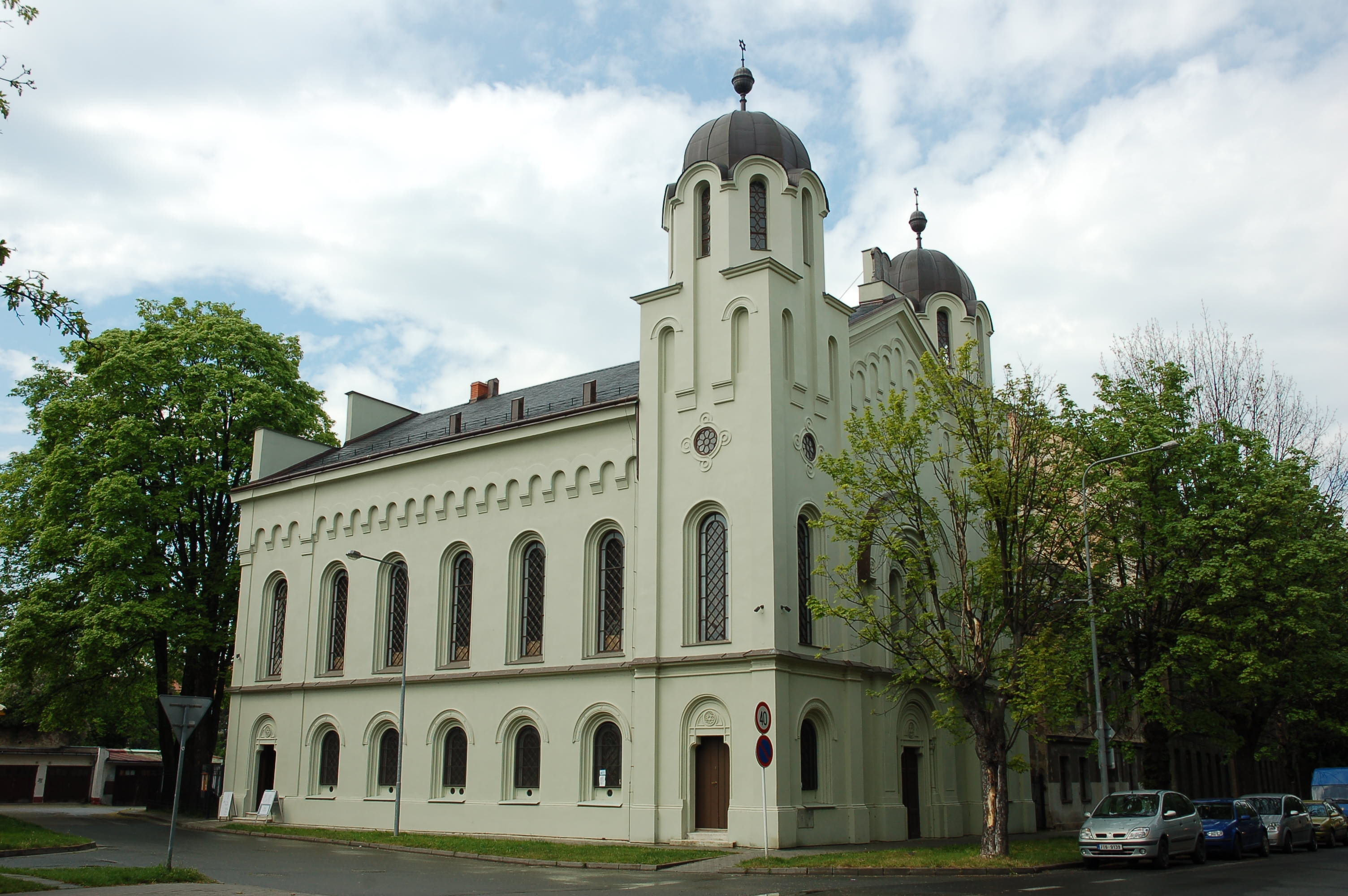
Krnov Synagogue

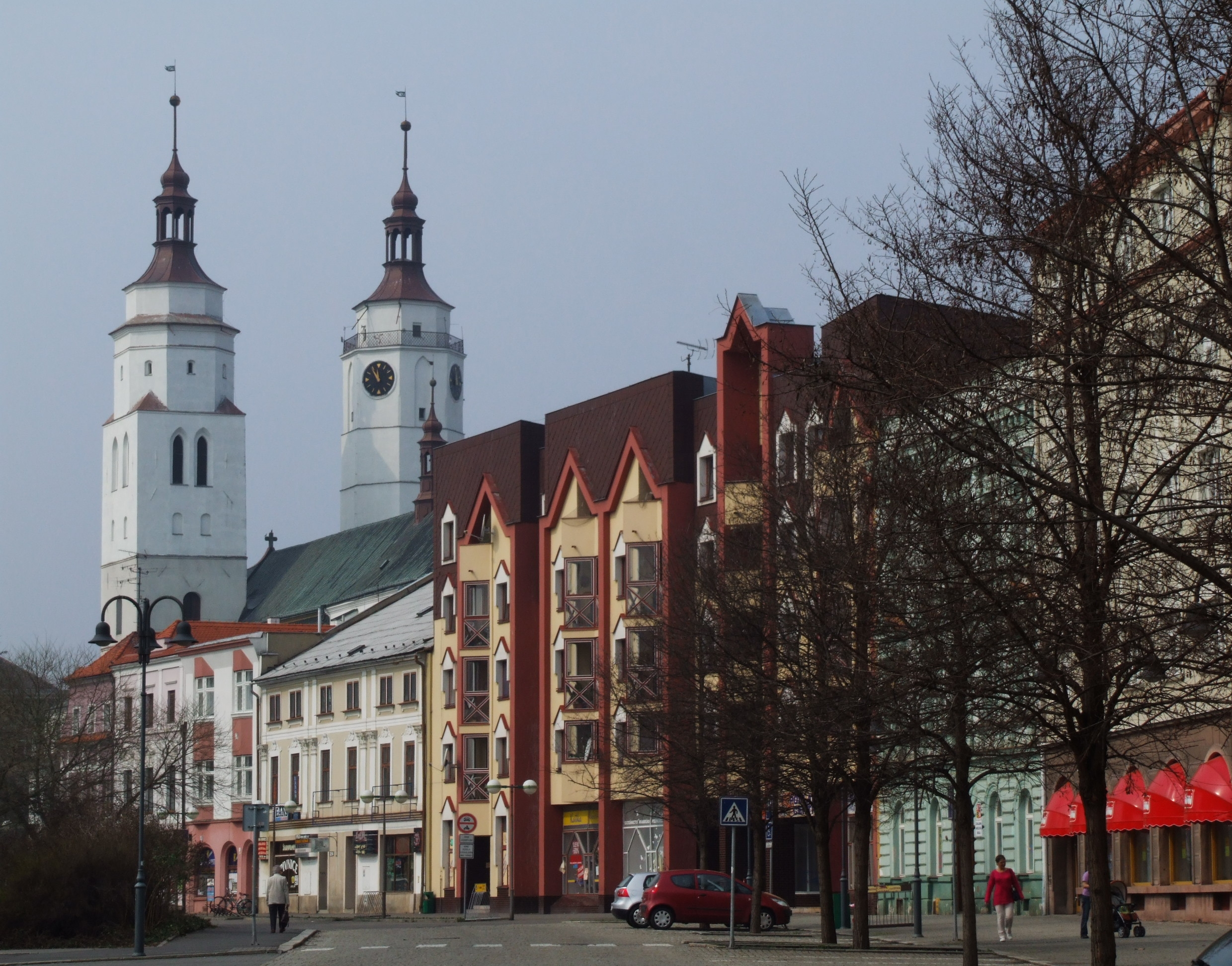
View from the town square towards the Church of Saint Martin

The main landmark of the town square is the Neo-Renaissance town hall. It was built in 1901–1903, on the site of an old town hall from the 16th century. It has a richly decorated 52 metres (171 ft) high tower, which is a copy of the Währing town hall tower. The town hall was designed by Leopold Bauer, native of Krnov. The second urban landmark is the town savings bank, connected with the town hall. The Art Nouveau-Baroque building with a richly structured façade was built in 1906–1907.

The Krnov Synagogue is the only synagogue in the region which survived to this day in its original form. The interior is the Moorish Revival style. Today it serves as an exhibition and concert hall.

The Church of Saint Martin in the historic centre was first documented in 1281. The wooden church was replaced by the current stone one at the turn of the 14th and 15th centuries. The second tower was added in the 16th century. The 67 metres (220 ft) high towers were part of the town's defense system. One of the towers is open to the public as a lookout tower.

The Church of Saint Benedict consists of a rotunda from the 13th century and a church without a tower. The interior is decorated with valuable frescoes from the period between the 13th and 15th centuries.

The Baroque complex of the Minorite monastery with the Church of the Nativity of the Virgin Mary was built after 1779, when the original Gothic buildings were destroyed by a fire. The monastery was abolished in 1950 and restored in 1989.

Krnov Castle was built in 1531–1535. Today it serves commercial purposes and as an administrative seat, and only the courtyard is freely accessible.

An important technical monument is the former cotton mill and warehouse of the Alois Larisch factory with a sample workshop, including a set of machinery. It is a Neoclassical building from 1922, protected as a national cultural monument.

=== Cvilín ===
Cvilín is a hill on the southeastern edge of the town, known as a pilgrimage site with the Church of Our Lady of the Seven Sorrows and Stations of the Cross. The church was built in 1722–1727 and replaced the wooden chapel, which did not have enough capacity for the number of believers participating in the pilgrimage. It is one of the most important Baroque monuments in the region. Since 2018, it has been protected as a national cultural monument.

On the hill is also a 26 metres (85 ft) high observation tower, constructed in 1902–1903. It is a stone romantic building topped by a lookout with a battlement. In the second part of the Cvilín hill is the ruin of the Cvilín Castle. It was built before 1253 and destroyed during the Thirty Years' War.

== Notable people ==
- Carol Benesch (1822–1896), architect
- Charles Louis Fleischmann (1835–1897), Austrian inventor and distiller
- Leopold Bauer (1872–1938), Austrian architect
- Heinrich Wolf (1875–1943), Austrian chess master
- Grete Berger (1883–1944), Austrian-German actress
- Robert Hohlbaum (1886–1955), Austrian-German writer and playwright
- Liesl Herbst (1903–1990), Austrian tennis player
- Norbert Riedel (1912–1963), Austrian engineer and entrepreneur
- Hanns Cibulka (1920–2004), German poet
- Edith Ballantyne (born 1922), Canadian activist
- Jiří Georg Dokoupil (born 1954), Czech-German painter and graphic artist
- Zdeňka Šilhavá (born 1954), discus thrower
- Leon Koudelak (born 1961), classical guitarist
- Jaroslav Sakala (born 1969), ski jumper
- Radek Bonk (born 1976), ice hockey player

== Twin towns – sister cities ==
Krnov is twinned with:

- Głubczyce, Poland
- Karben, Germany
- Lykovrysi-Pefki, Greece
- Mińsk Mazowiecki, Poland
- Nadvirna, Ukraine
- Prudnik, Poland
- Rajec, Slovakia
- Saint-Égrève, France
- Telšiai, Lithuania

== Gallery ==
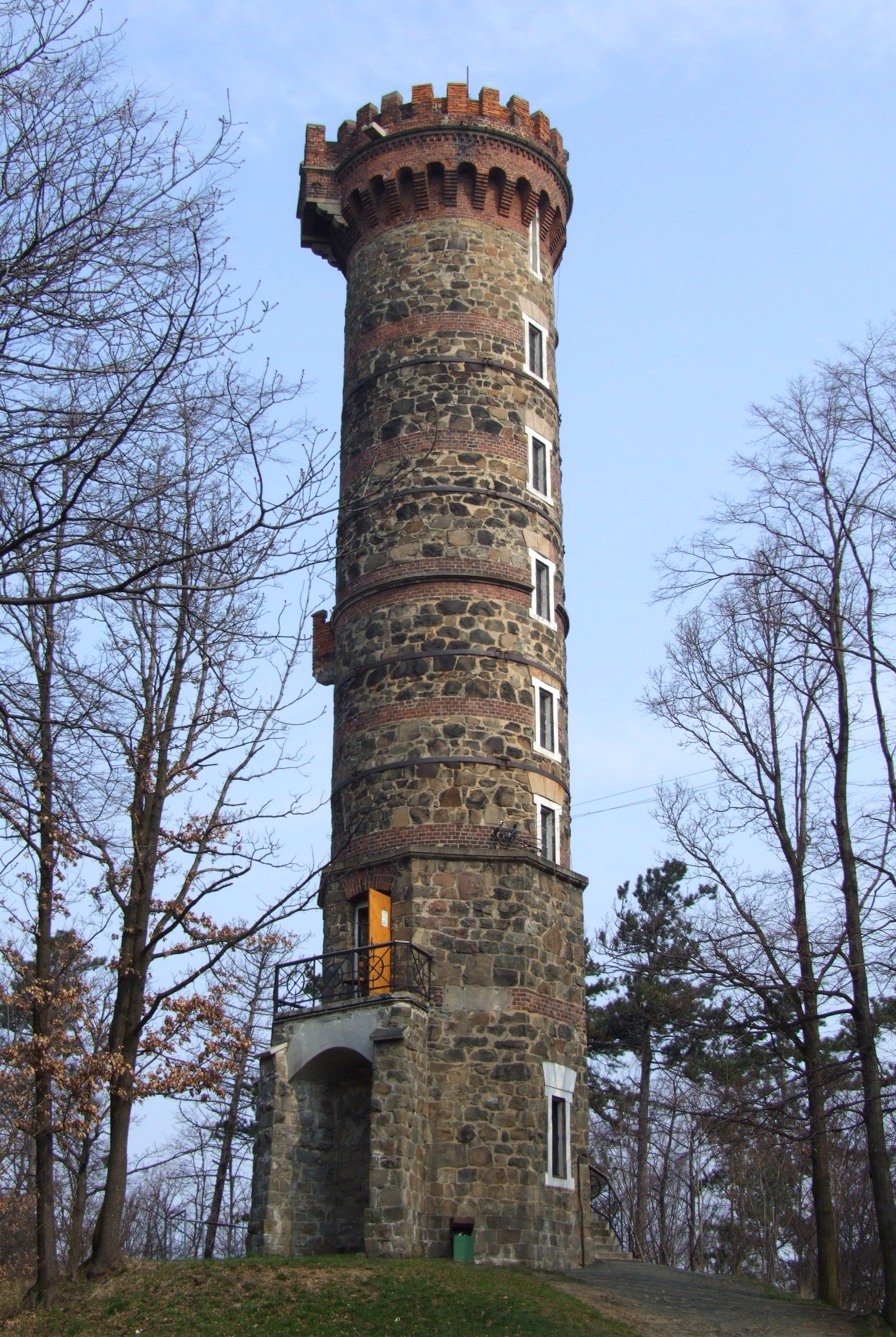
Cvilín observation tower

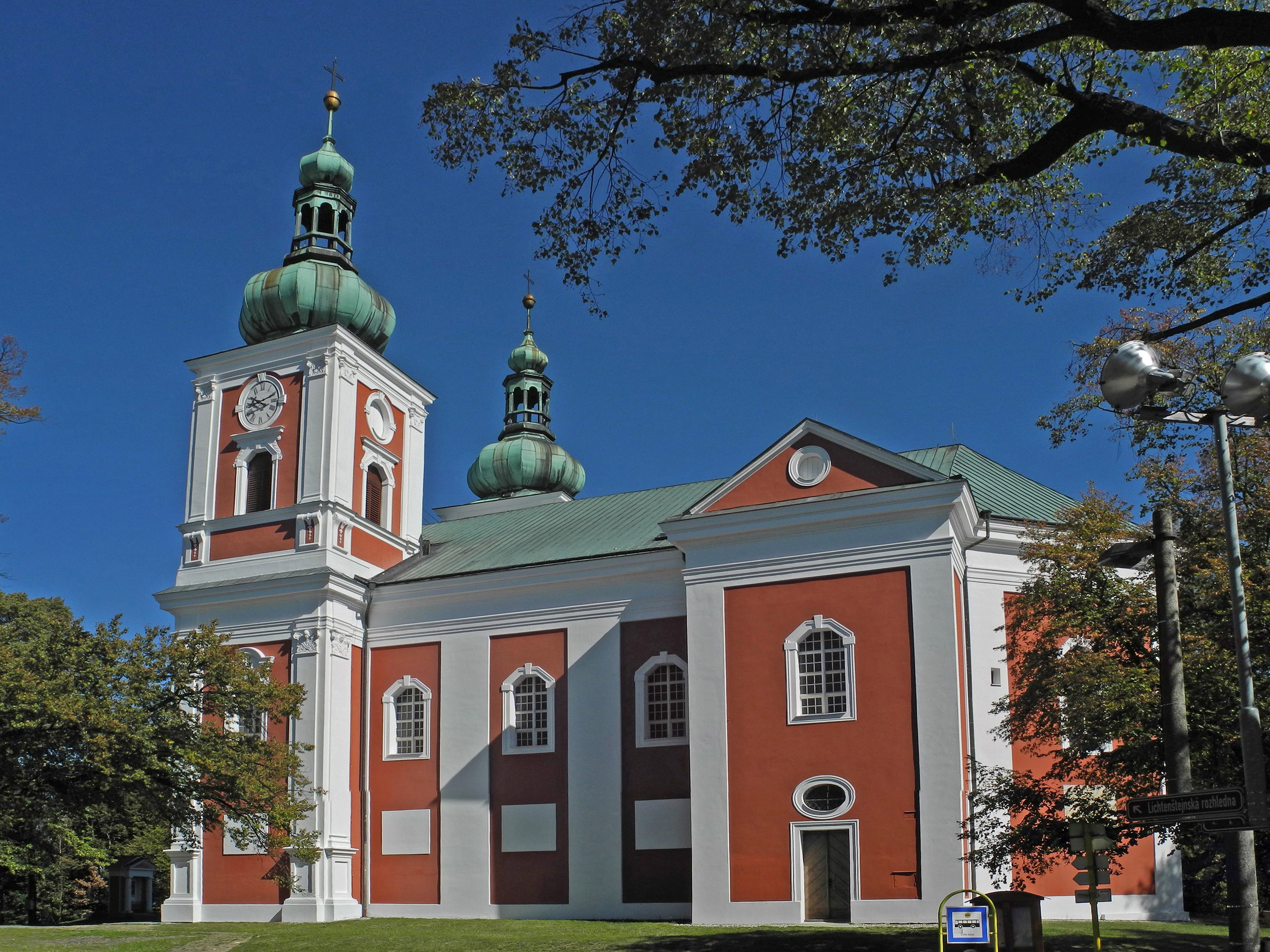
Church of Our Lady of the Seven Sorrows on Cvilín

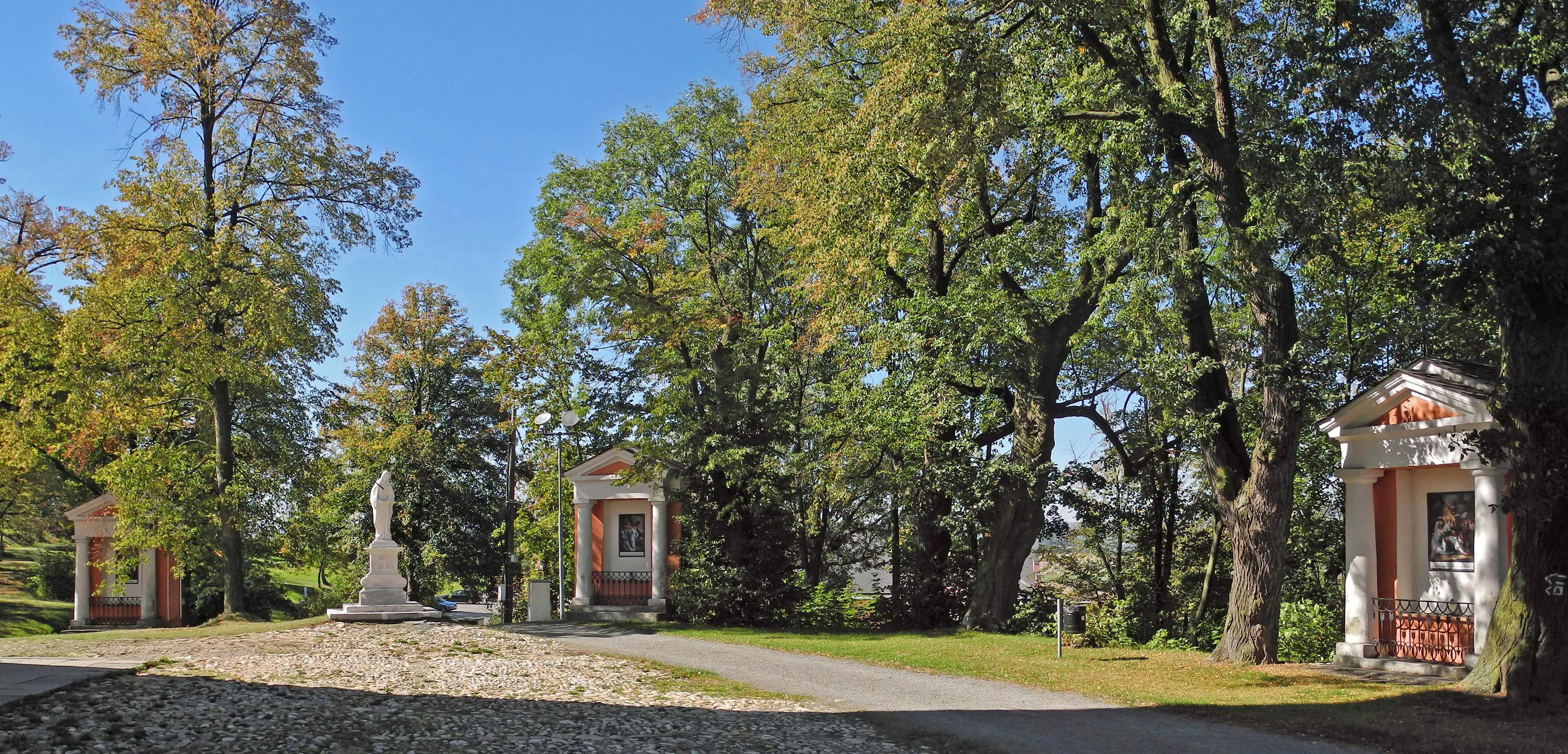
Stations of the Cross on Cvilín

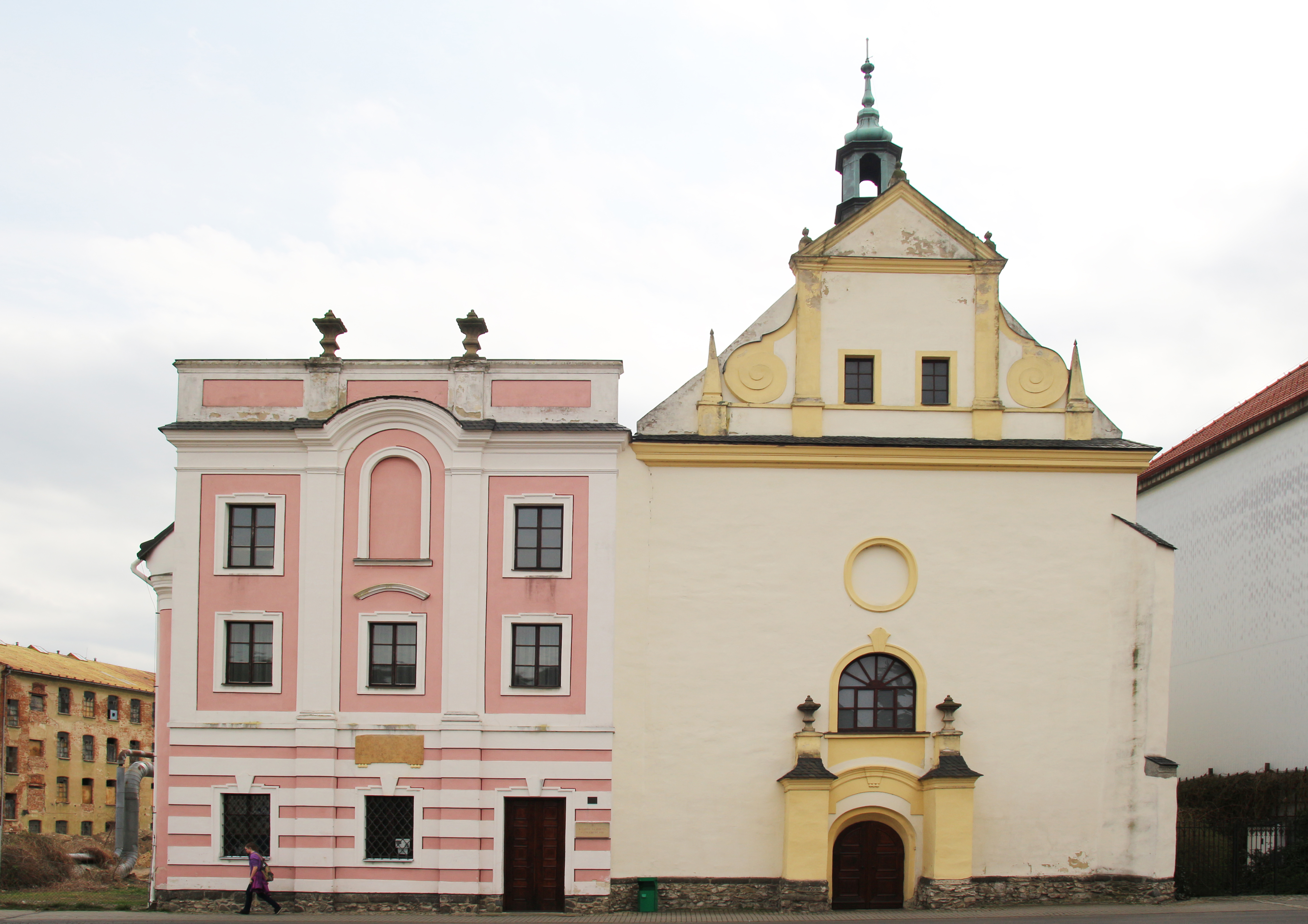
Church of the Holy Spirit

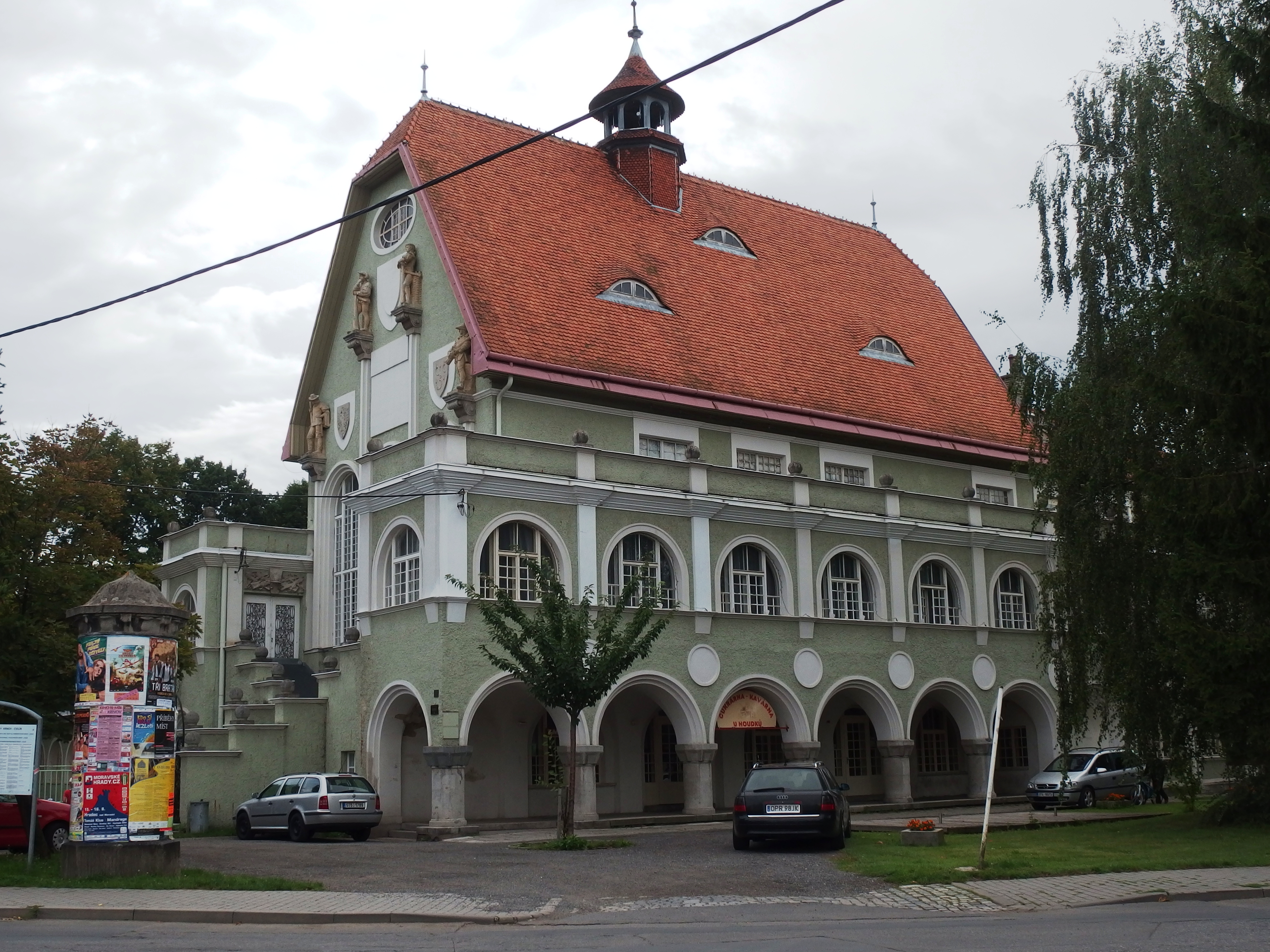
Shooting house

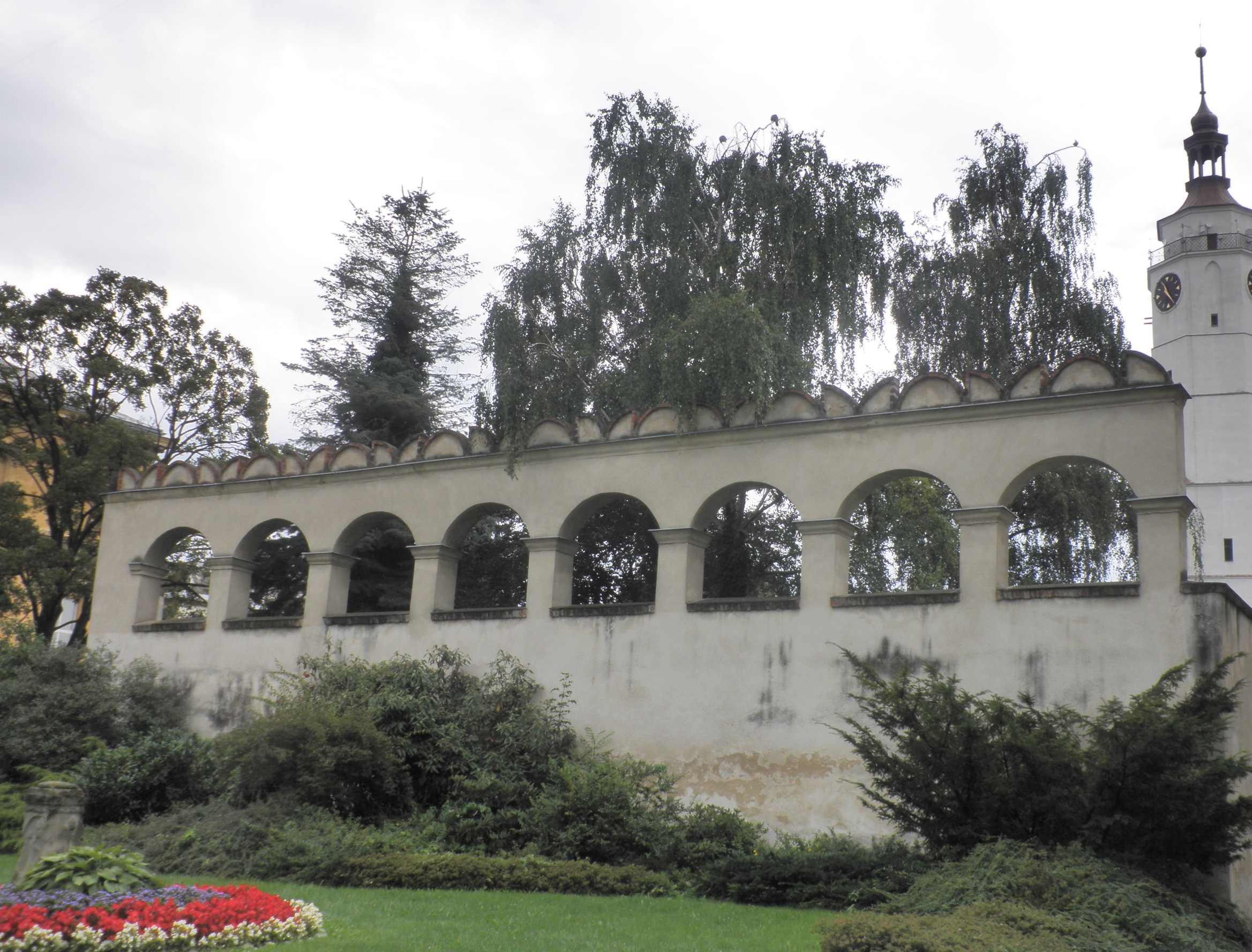
Swedish wall
