= Karel Svolinský =

Czech painter, graphic artist, illustrator and university professor

- Born: 14 January 1896; Svatý Kopeček, Moravia, Austria-Hungary
- Died: 16 September 1986 (aged 90); Prague, Czechoslovakia
- Education: Academy of Arts, Architecture and Design in Prague

Karel Svolinský (14 January 1896 – 16 September 1986) was a Czech painter, graphic artist, illustrator, typographer, typeface designer, theatre stage designer and university professor.

== Life ==
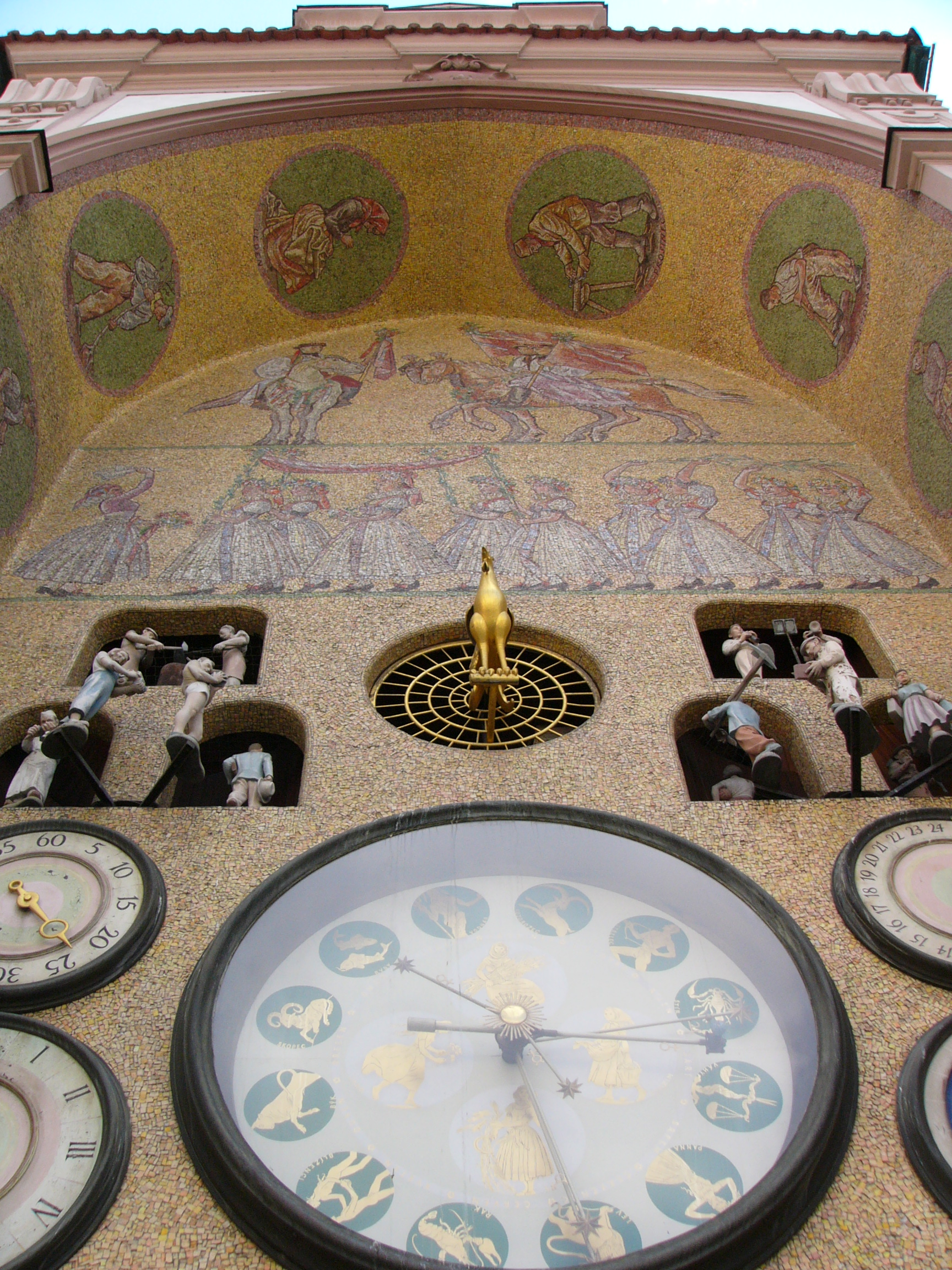
Olomouc Astronomical Clock detail, graphic design by Svolinský

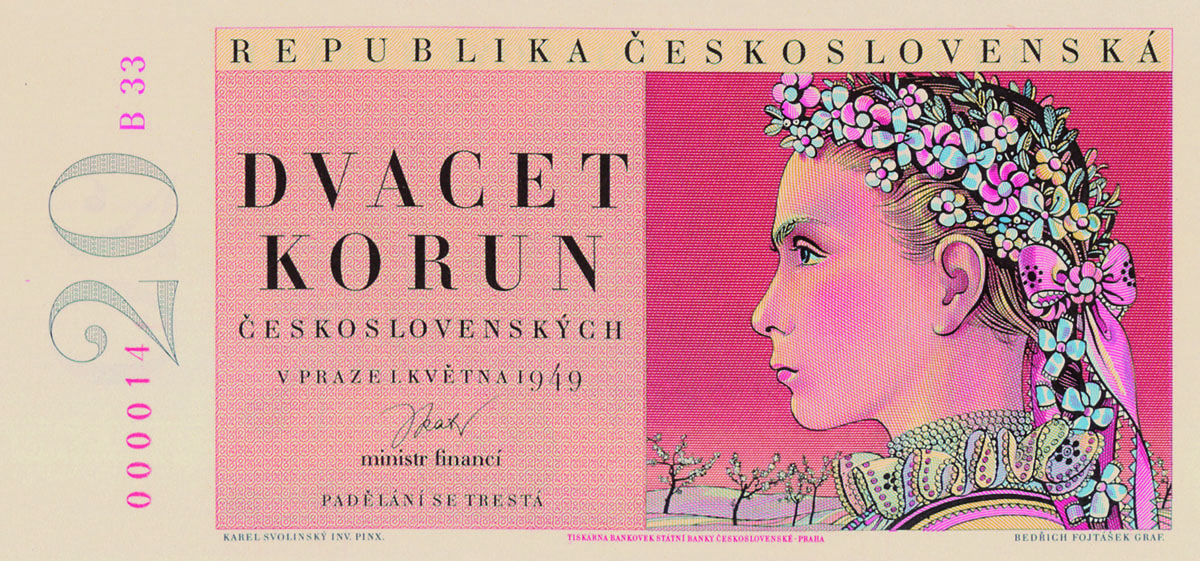
Banknote designed by Svolinský

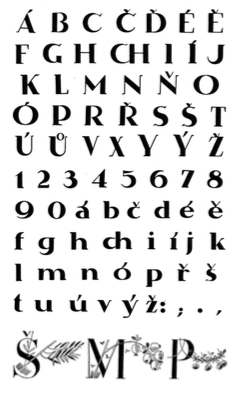
Typeface created in 1924 for printing Mácha's Máj

Svolinský was born in Svatý Kopeček in Moravia, Austria-Hungary (today part of Olomouc, Czech Republic). Initially, in 1910–1916, he trained as a woodcarver in Prague. In 1919 he decided to continue his studies at the Academy of Arts, Architecture and Design in Prague, where he studied painting and graphic arts with Štěpán Zálešák (1919–1921) and sculpture with Bohumil Kafka (1921). Later he focused mainly on graphic art and mural painting, which he studied with František Kysela between 1922 and 1927. In 1945 he started teaching at the academy as the head of the Special Studio of Applied Graphic Art.

== Work ==
The focus of Svolinský's work is drawing inspired by folk traditions, folklore and nature. In addition to drawing, he was mainly devoted to free form graphics, small-scale graphics (Ex libris) and applied graphics (posters, banknotes, postage stamps), experimenting with graphic techniques. His typical graphic technique is woodcarve and woodcut (related to his training as a carver). He also excelled in book graphics and illustration. In addition, he designed tapestries, was a successful scenographer (theatre stage designer) and, above all, the author of the designs for several monumental realisations:

- 1930–1931: stained glass design for the Schwarzenberg family chapel in St. Vitus Cathedral in Prague
- 1949–1954: design of the new form of the Olomouc Astronomical Clock, in the style of socialist realism (in collaboration with his wife, sculptor Marie Svolinská and with Olbram Zoubek)

He had been involved in stage design since 1940, when he was invited to the National Theatre in Prague by conductor Václav Talich to work on Dvořák's Jacobin. Later, he did guest stage design mainly for the Czech opera repertoire in Prague, as well as at the State Theatres in Brno, Olomouc, Plzeň and other cities. He also prepared a guest production of Janáček's Jenůfa for the Vienna State Opera (1968).

Svolinský illustrated a number of books (among the most famous is the four-volume publication The Czech Year by Karel Plicka and František Volf, (1944–1960) and covers of music books (e.g. by B. Smetana, L. Janáček, Z. Fibich). In 1925, his festive print of Mácha's Máj (for which he designed an original typeface and created a number of illustrations) received a main prize at the International Exhibition of Decorative Arts in Paris. He also created posters, postage stamps, ex-libris, banknotes, etc. He also created a number of stained glass works, mosaics and glass paintings. Since 1935 he was a member of the Mánes Union of Fine Arts and an honorary member of the Hollar group.

Svolinský is considered to be a continuator of the Mánes–Aleš tradition in Czech art.

Svolinský is considered one of the two main Czech creators of botanical illustrations, alongside Otto Ušák.
