= Erma Zarska =

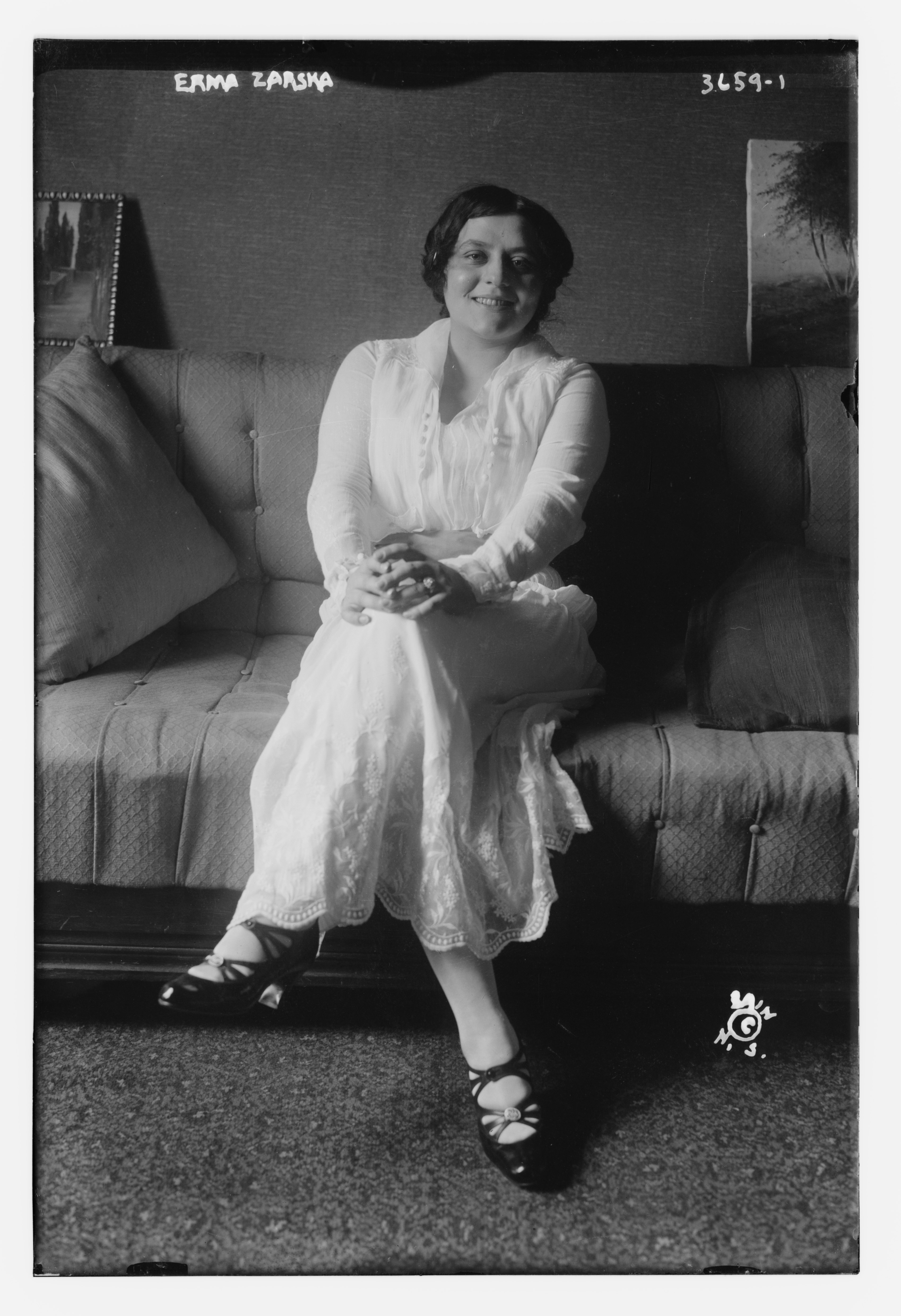
- Erma Zarska, from the Bain News Service collection, Library of Congress
- Born: Hermína Maria Žárská; 9 June 1889; Olomouc, Austria-Hungary
- Died: 30 March 1971 (aged 81); Prague, Czechoslovakia
- Other names: Heřma Žárská, Erma Zareska
- Occupation: Opera singer

Heřma Žárská (born Hermína Maria Žárská, in English known as Erma Zarska or Erma Zareska; 9 June 1889 – 30 March 1971) was a Czech opera singer. She was soprano with the Metropolitan Opera in the 1915–1916 season. She also sang with the National Theatre in Prague and the Slovak National Theatre.

== Personal life ==
Hermína Maria Žárská was born in Olomouc, the daughter of Ignác Žárský, a blacksmith and carriage builder. She trained as a singer in Prague and Berlin. In the years 1913-1914, she studied singing at the Stern Conservatory in Berlin with Alfredo Cairati.

Zarska died in Prague in 1971, aged 81 years.

== Career ==
Zarska sang at the Prague National Theatre as a young woman, in Hubička, Dalibor, and The Bartered Bride, all operas by Smetana. She made her debut with the Metropolitan Opera in New York in November 1915; however, "a severe cold" affected her voice, and it failed during her debut performance in Lohengrin. "At the end she was singing almost in a whisper," according to the New York Times reviewer. Emmy Destinn returned to the Met to take over the role while Zarska recovered.

Zarska also sang the role of Santuzza in the Met's production of Cavalleria rusticana in February 1916, with Sophie Braslau singing another part. During the run of Rusticana, she had a further embarrassment on stage, when her daring gown's shoulder strap slipped and "the audience saw a great deal of Erma", according to reports. She returned to Europe at the end of that season, when her contract was not renewed.

She made recordings for Columbia in 1916. She was a soloist with the Slovak National Theatre in the 1921–1922 season.
