= Zora Vesecká =

Czech actress (born 1967)

- Born: March 3, 1967 (age 58); Olomouc, Czechoslovakia
- Occupation: Actress
- Years active: 1977–1982

Zora Vesecká (born 3 March 1967) is a Czech actress. Rising to national attention as a child actor, she gave up on her acting career, eventually becoming a dentist.

== Selected filmography ==
- Neohlížej se, jde za námi kůň (1979)
- Brontosaurus (1979)
- Muž přes palubu (1980)
- Drž se rovně, Kačenko (1981)
