= Olomouc astronomical clock =

Coordinates: 49.5945979°N 17.2511695°E

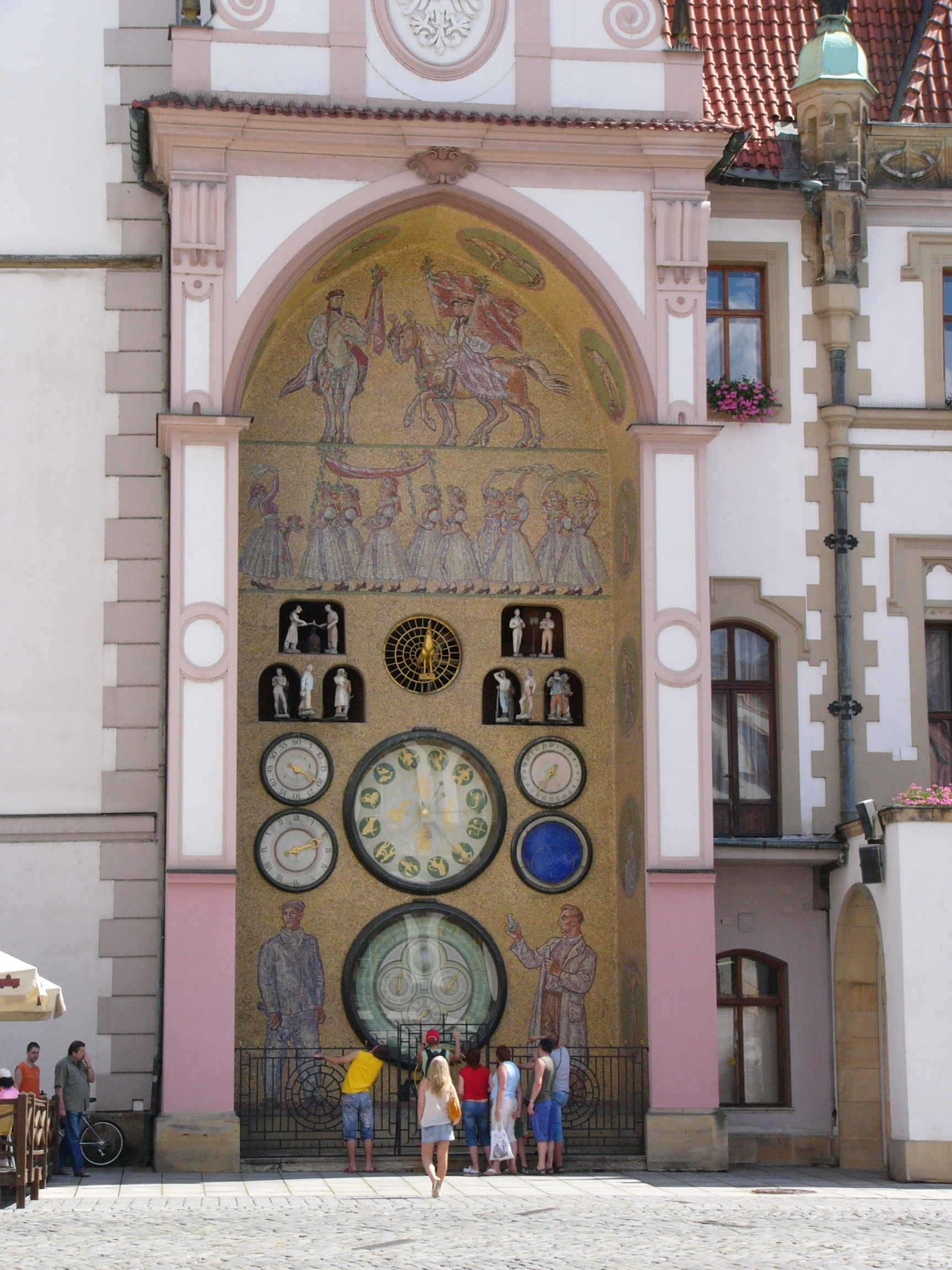
Olomouc Astronomical Clock

Sound of the Clock's carillon in 1942

The Olomouc Astronomical Clock (Czech: Olomoucký orloj) is part of the northern wall of the town hall of Olomouc, Czech Republic. The astronomical clock was built in the 15th century and has been reconstructed several times. The current appearance is from 1955 in the socialist realism style. It is one of the few heliocentric clocks in the world.

== Physical description ==
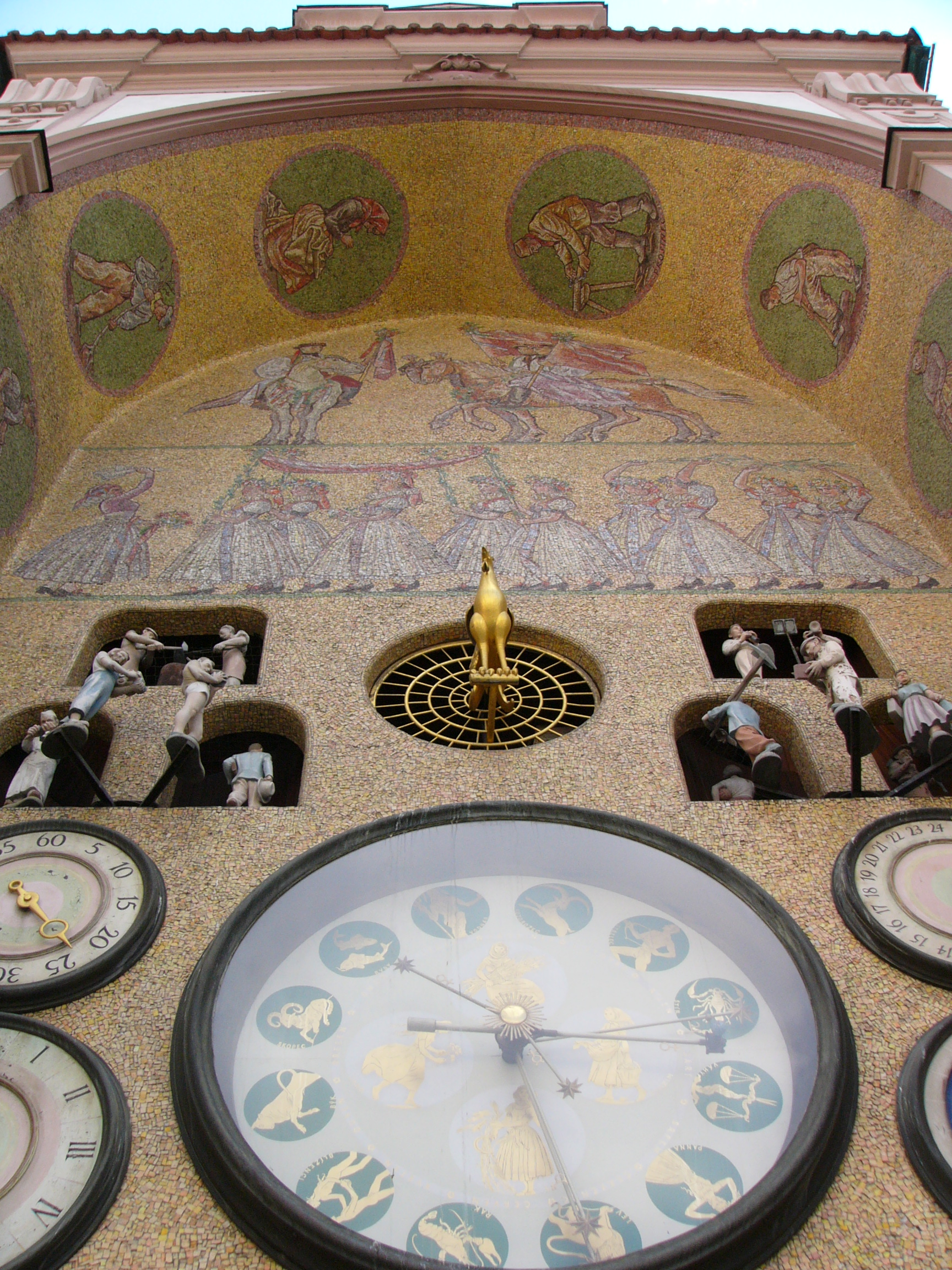
Detail of the decoration of the clock

The clock is located on the Northeastern facade of the town hall, the arched alcove is approximately 14 meters high. The lower dial represents the earthly sphere and indicates minute, hour, day, month, year and phase of the moon. The calendar at the bottom of the clock indicates the Czech name days and important days of the Communist regime, such as the birthdays of Stalin and Gottwald. The upper dial represents the heavenly sphere and shows a star map, the Sun, Earth and planets against a background of the twelve houses of the zodiac.

Noon is announced by a brass cockrel, and animated figurines of various proletariat figures who scroll past the windows of the clock for seven minutes. Professions represented include a miner, baker, clerk, volleyball player, auto mechanic and factory worker.

The main facade is surrounded by a mosaic depicting the Ride of the Kings and a "procession of maidens" (above), a worker holding a wrench (left), and a chemist holding a flask (right). Around the perimeter of the alcove there are mosaic allegorical representations of the twelve seasons and two traditional festivals. There are sixteen bells that were cast by P. Hilzer in 1898. According to the original design, the carillon was to play The Internationale, but now plays three folksongs instead: Daleká, šeroká cesta přes Holomóc, Vrbe jož se zelenajó, and Za Náměšťó na kopečko hádajó se o děvečko.

== History ==
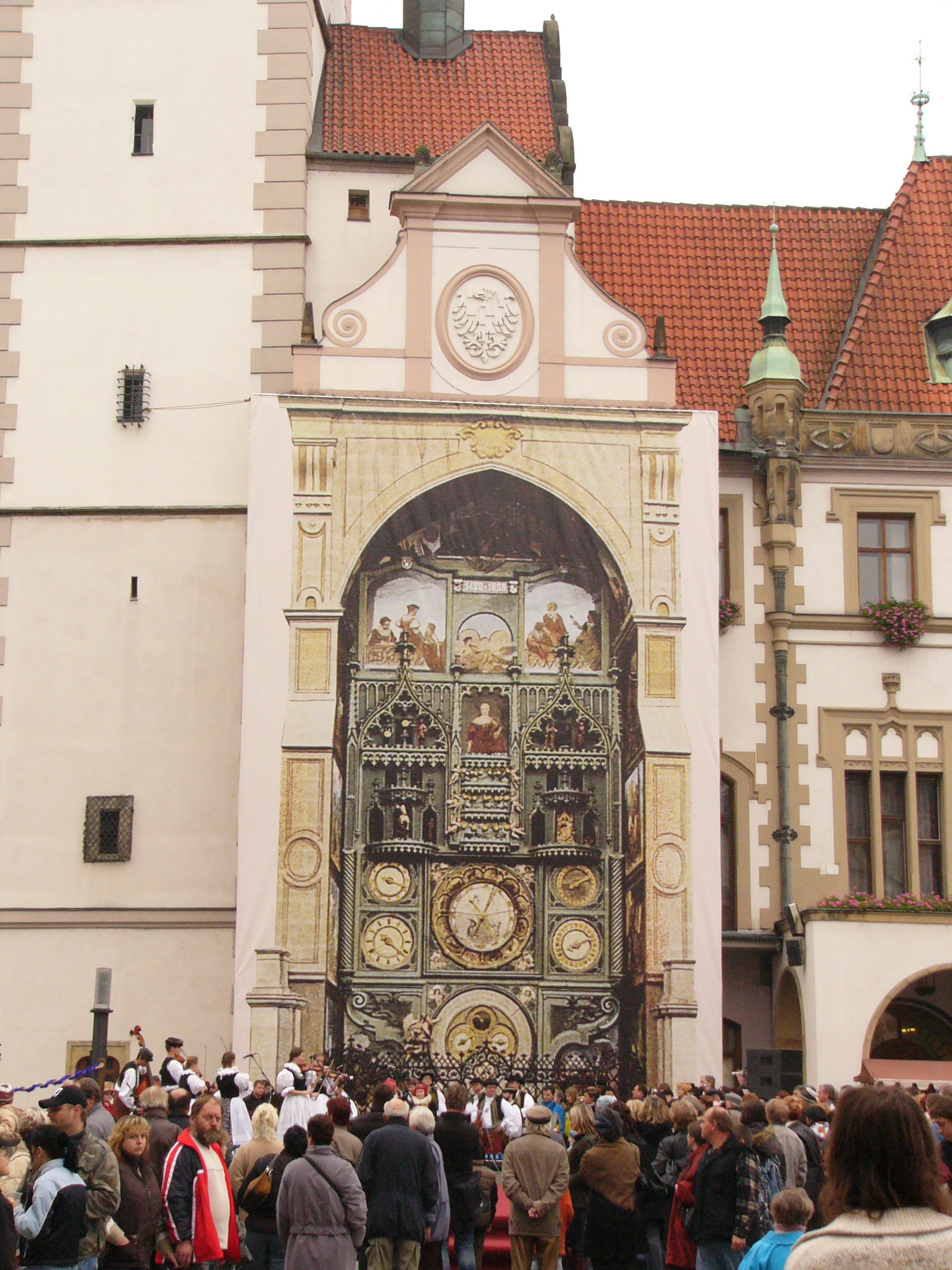
A canvas display of how the clock used to look before it was destroyed in World War II and rebuilt in its present form

The first "undisputed" mention of the clock is from 1519 but according to tradition, it was built between 1419 and 1422. Local legend claims that the astronomer was blinded so that he could not build a similar work in another city.

The clock has been rebuilt several times during its history and equipped with various moving figurines, including St. Wenceslas, St. George on his horse and the dragon, and Three kings on their camels. In 1800, the clock stopped for eleven years, then after temporary repairs stood still again until 1898. The oldest parts of the current clock are from that year, when the clock was equipped with a heliocentric dial by Eduard Korfhage. In 1926 it was decorated by prominent artist Jano Kohlerem. The clock was damaged by a grenade in May 1945, in the final days of the Second World War, by soldiers from the retreating Nazi German army passing through Olomouc. Fragments from that version are now kept in the city museum. Shortly afterward it was returned to the form it was given in 1926, but was then completely rebuilt in 1955 by Karel Svolinský in the Socialist realism style. The commissioning ceremony took place on 9 May 1955 in the presence of Communist dignitaries.

The clock was featured in the opening scenes of the 1969 Czech film The Joke based on the book by Milan Kundera.

== See also ==
- Prague astronomical clock
