= Olomouc =

City in the Czech Republic

- Statutory city
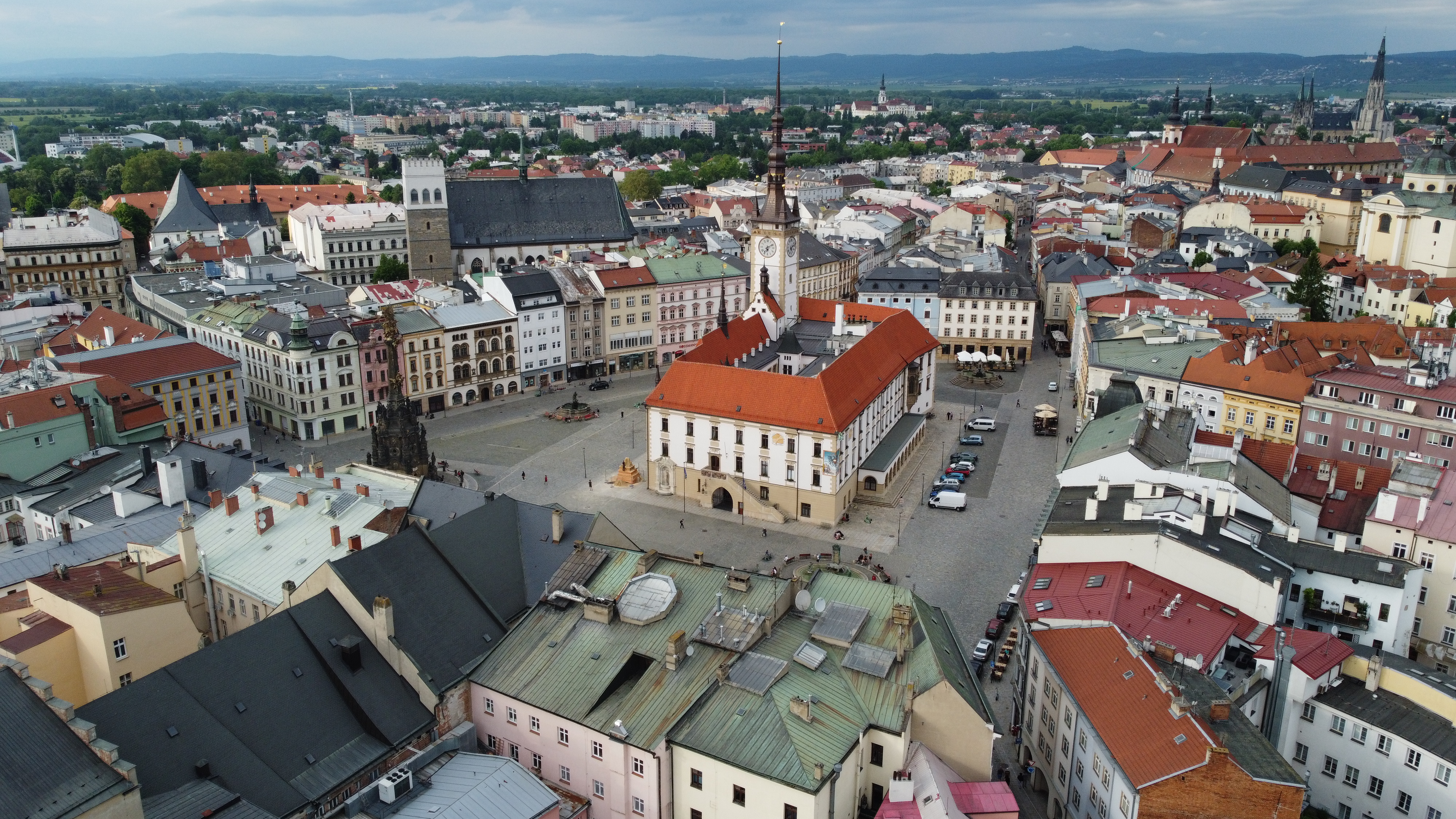
- The square Horní náměstí, the historic city centre (left: Holy Trinity Column; middle: Olomouc City Hall)

- Flag Coat of arms Wordmark

- Location in the Czech Republic
- Coordinates: 49°35′38″N 17°15′3″E
- Country: Czech Republic
- Region: Olomouc
- District: Olomouc
- First mentioned: 1017

Government
  - Mayor: Marek Zelenka (STAN)

Area
  - Total: 103.33 km^{2} (39.90 sq mi)
- Elevation: 219 m (719 ft)

Population (2026-01-01)
  - Total: 105,297
  - Density: 1,019.0/km^{2} (2,639.3/sq mi)
- Time zone: UTC+1 (CET)
  - Summer (DST): UTC+2 (CEST)
- Postal code: 779 00
- Website: www.olomouc.eu

UNESCO World Heritage Site
- Official name: Holy Trinity Column in Olomouc
- Criteria: i, iv
- Reference: 859
- Inscription: 2000 (24th Session)

Olomouc (Czech pronunciation: [ˈolomouts]; German: Olmütz) is a city in the Czech Republic. It has about 105,000 inhabitants, making it the sixth largest city in the country. It is the administrative centre of the Olomouc Region.

Located on the Morava River, the city is the ecclesiastical metropolis and was a historical co-capital city of Moravia, before having been occupied by the Swedish army during the Thirty Years' War. The historic city centre is well preserved and is protected as urban monument reservation. The Holy Trinity Column was listed as a UNESCO World Heritage Site in 2000 for its quintessential Baroque style and symbolic value.

== Administrative division ==
Olomouc consists of 26 municipal parts (in brackets population according to the 2021 census):

- Olomouc (13,446)
- Bělidla (834)
- Černovír (1,010)
- Chomoutov (1,070)
- Chválkovice (2,398)
- Droždín (1,340)
- Hejčín (2,856)
- Hodolany (8,444)
- Holice (4,248)
- Klášterní Hradisko (1,787)
- Lazce (5,871)
- Lošov (732)
- Nedvězí (538)
- Nemilany (1,312)
- Neředín (8,928)
- Nová Ulice (19,214)
- Nové Sady (13,524)
- Nový Svět (947)
- Pavlovičky (484)
- Povel (9,553)
- Radíkov (382)
- Řepčín (2,661)
- Slavonín (2,847)
- Svatý Kopeček (801)
- Topolany (361)
- Týneček (475)

== Etymology ==
The origin of the name is unknown. According to the most frequently considered theory, it was derived from the personal name Olmút, meaning "Olmút's (castle, court)". Another theory says that the name was derived from the Proto-Slavic words *ol ('beer') and *mútit ('to make noise').

According to legend, there was a Roman fort founded by Roman legionnaires under the command of Julius Caesar. The fort was called Iuliomontium or Julimons, and the name Olomouc was derived from it. Although archaeologists have found traces of a camp of Roman legionnaires, the legend of the presence of Julius Caesar originated in the Renaissance period and nothing confirms it.

== Geography ==
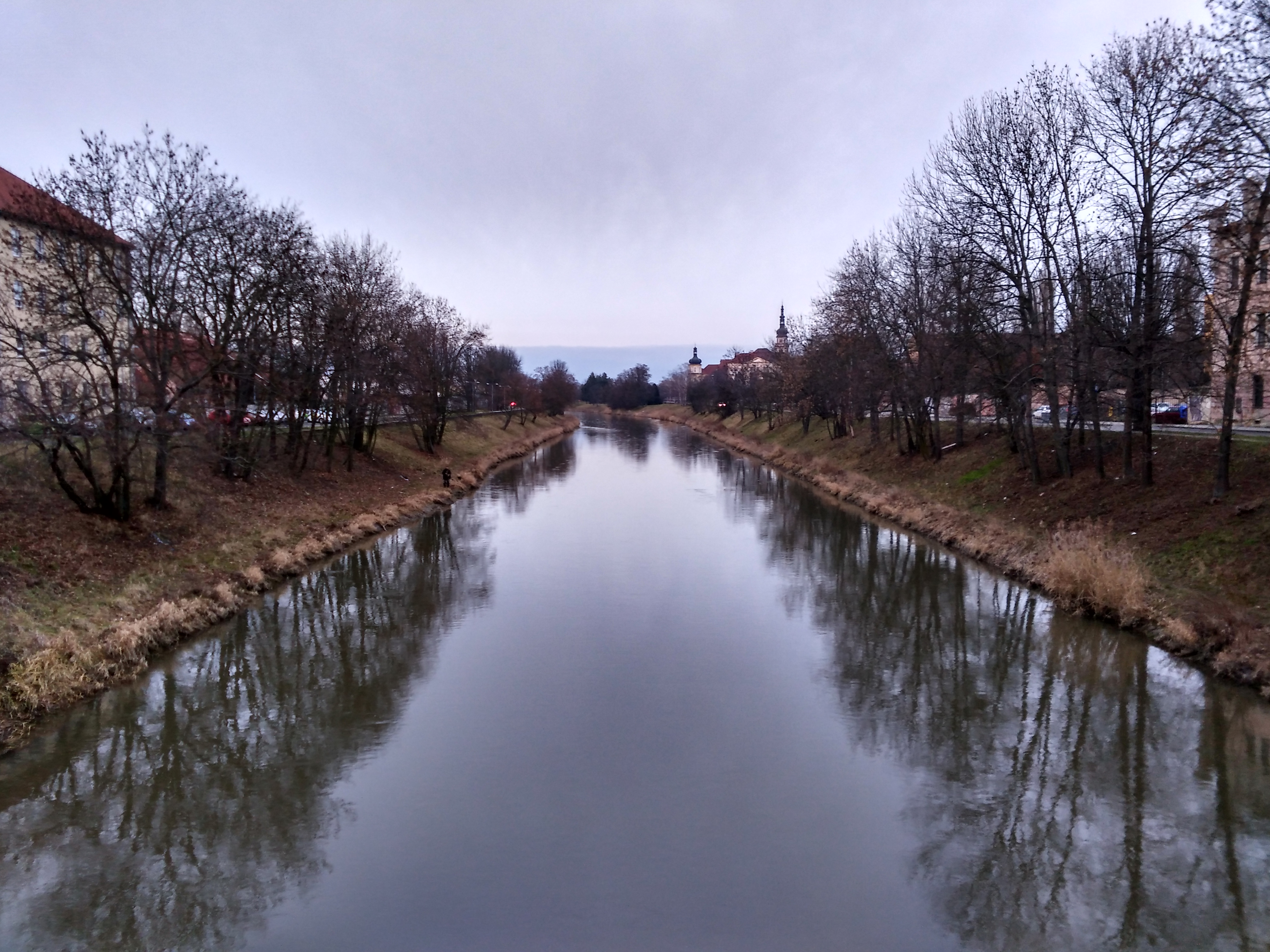
The Morava River in Olomouc

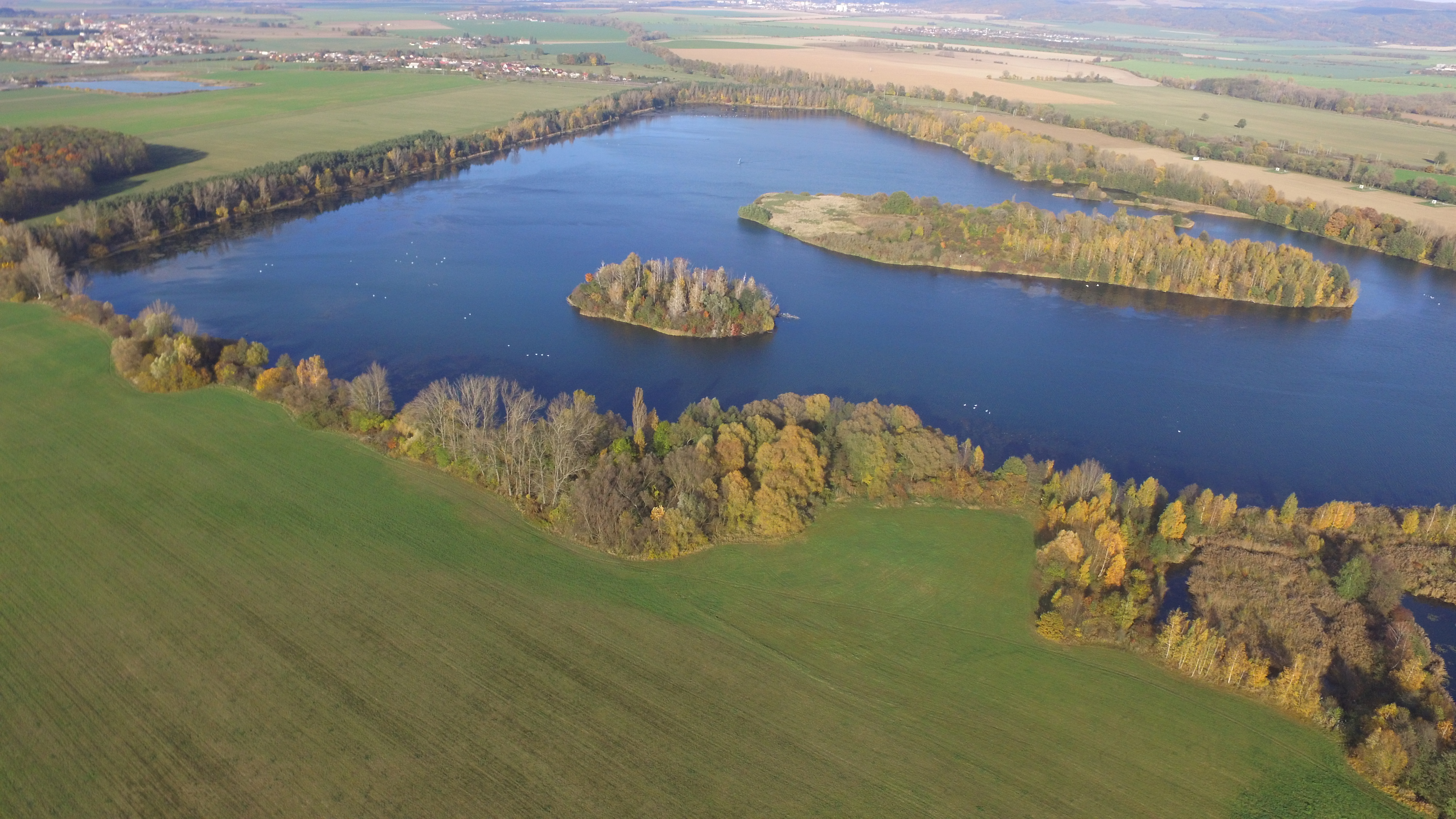
Lake Chomoutovské jezero

Olomouc is located about 61 kilometres (38 mi) northeast of Brno and 200 km (120 mi) southeast of Prague. It lies mostly in a flat fertile land of the Upper Morava Valley. The eastern spur of the municipal territory (the villages of Lošov, Radíkov and Svatý Kopeček) extends into the Nízký Jeseník range and includes the highest point of Olomouc, a hill at 444 m (1,457 ft) above sea level. The Litovelské Pomoraví Protected Landscape Area extends into the territory of Olomouc in the north.

The Morava River and the stream of Mlýnský potok, which is a branch of the Morava, flow through the city. The Bystřice flows into the Morava at the city centre. The Oskava briefly forms the northern municipal border, before it joins the Morava.

Lake Chomoutovské jezero, located in the northern tip of the municipal territory, was created by flooding a gravel quarry and has an area of 85 ha (210 acres). Together with the immediate surroundings, it is protected as a nature monument. The lake is an important stop for migratory birds and is home to one of the largest colonies of black-headed gulls and Mediterranean gulls in the country.

=== Climate ===
Olomouc's climate is classified as humid continental climate (Köppen: Dfb; Trewartha: Dcbo). Among them, the annual average temperature is 9.6 °C (49.3 °F), the hottest month is July with a mean daily temperature 20.3 °C (68.5 °F), and the coldest month is January with −1.4 °C (29.5 °F). The annual precipitation is 532.3 millimetres (20.96 in), of which July is the wettest with 78.7 millimetres (3.10 in), while February is the driest with only 21.5 millimetres (0.85 in). The extreme temperature throughout the year ranged from −33.6 °C (−28.5 °F) on 11 February 1929 to 37.2 °C (99.0 °F) on 3 and 8 August 2013.

Climate data for Olomouc-Holice, 1991–2020 normals, extremes 1853–present
Month	Jan	Feb	Mar	Apr	May	Jun	Jul	Aug	Sep	Oct	Nov	Dec	Year
Record high °C (°F)	16.7 (62.1)	17.6 (63.7)	23.7 (74.7)	29.2 (84.6)	31.5 (88.7)	35.3 (95.5)	37.0 (98.6)	37.2 (99.0)	32.5 (90.5)	26.9 (80.4)	20.7 (69.3)	14.2 (57.6)	37.2 (99.0)
Mean daily maximum °C (°F)	1.4 (34.5)	3.9 (39.0)	9.0 (48.2)	16.0 (60.8)	20.4 (68.7)	23.9 (75.0)	26.3 (79.3)	26.2 (79.2)	20.4 (68.7)	13.9 (57.0)	7.5 (45.5)	2.3 (36.1)	14.3 (57.7)
Daily mean °C (°F)	−1.4 (29.5)	0.3 (32.5)	4.3 (39.7)	10.3 (50.5)	14.9 (58.8)	18.4 (65.1)	20.3 (68.5)	19.9 (67.8)	14.7 (58.5)	9.3 (48.7)	4.5 (40.1)	−0.1 (31.8)	9.6 (49.3)
Mean daily minimum °C (°F)	−4.3 (24.3)	−3.2 (26.2)	−0.1 (31.8)	4.2 (39.6)	8.9 (48.0)	12.4 (54.3)	14.0 (57.2)	13.8 (56.8)	9.7 (49.5)	5.4 (41.7)	1.6 (34.9)	−2.7 (27.1)	5.0 (41.0)
Record low °C (°F)	−27.9 (−18.2)	−33.6 (−28.5)	−24.3 (−11.7)	−8.2 (17.2)	−3.1 (26.4)	−1.2 (29.8)	4.1 (39.4)	1.4 (34.5)	−2.0 (28.4)	−7.2 (19.0)	−15.6 (3.9)	−25.5 (−13.9)	−33.6 (−28.5)
Average precipitation mm (inches)	23.6 (0.93)	21.5 (0.85)	29.9 (1.18)	33.6 (1.32)	58.4 (2.30)	66.3 (2.61)	78.7 (3.10)	60.9 (2.40)	56.3 (2.22)	39.4 (1.55)	34.7 (1.37)	29.0 (1.14)	532.3 (20.96)
Average snowfall cm (inches)	12.1 (4.8)	7.3 (2.9)	3.2 (1.3)	0.6 (0.2)	0.0 (0.0)	0.0 (0.0)	0.0 (0.0)	0.0 (0.0)	0.0 (0.0)	0.0 (0.0)	2.9 (1.1)	9.0 (3.5)	35.1 (13.8)
Average relative humidity (%)	85.7	81.1	74.2	65.6	68.0	69.3	67.4	67.4	74.9	81.3	85.7	86.6	75.6
Mean monthly sunshine hours	47.5	77.0	132.7	201.1	235.6	238.0	252.8	247.9	173.1	107.6	52.5	37.9	1,803.7
Source: Czech Hydrometeorological Institute

== History ==
=== Middle Ages ===
As early as the 7th century, a gord of the early Slavs developed in the present-day quarter of Povel. It was probably an administrative centre of a larger unit. Povel is considered one of the three most important Moravian localities of the early Middle Ages. In the early 9th century, the gord was conquered and completely disappeared.

A new centre, where the Great Moravian governor resided, developed at the gord at Předhradí, a quarter of the inner city (the eastern, smaller part of the medieval centre). This settlement survived the defeat of the Great Moravia (c. 907) and gradually became the capital of the province of Moravia.

The bishopric of Olomouc was founded in 1063. It was possibly re-founded because there are some unclear references to bishops of Moravia in the 10th century—if they were not only missionary bishops, but representatives of some remains of regular church organization, then it is very likely that these bishops had their seat in Olomouc. Centuries later in 1777, it was raised to the rank of an archbishopric. The bishopric was moved from the church of St. Peter (since destroyed) to the church of Saint Wenceslaus in 1141 (the date is still disputed, other suggestions are 1131, 1134) under bishop Jindřich Zdík. The bishop's palace was built in the Romanesque architectural style. The bishopric acquired large tracts of land, especially in northern Moravia, and was one of the richest in the area.

Olomouc became one of the most important settlements in Moravia and a seat of the Přemyslid government and one of the appanage princes. In 1306 King Wenceslas III stopped here on his way to Poland. He was going to fight Władysław I the Elbow-high to claim his rights to the Polish crown and was assassinated. With his death, the whole Přemyslid dynasty died out.

The city was officially founded in the mid-13th century and became one of the most important trade and power centres in the region. In the Middle Ages, it was the biggest town in Moravia and competed with Brno for the position of capital. Olomouc finally lost after the Swedes took the city and held it for eight years (1642–1650).

In 1235, the Mongols launched an invasion of Europe. After the Battle of Legnica in Poland, the Mongols carried their raids into Moravia, but were defensively defeated at the fortified town of Olomouc. The Mongols subsequently invaded and defeated Hungary.

In 1454 the city expelled its Jewish population as part of a wave of anti-Semitism, also seen in Spain and Portugal. The second half of the 15th century is considered the start of Olomouc's golden age. It hosted several royal meetings, and Matthias Corvinus was elected here as King of Bohemia (in fact anti-king) by the estates in 1469. In 1479 two kings of Bohemia (Vladislaus II and Matthias Corvinus) met here and concluded an agreement (Peace of Olomouc of 1479) for splitting the country.

=== Modern era ===
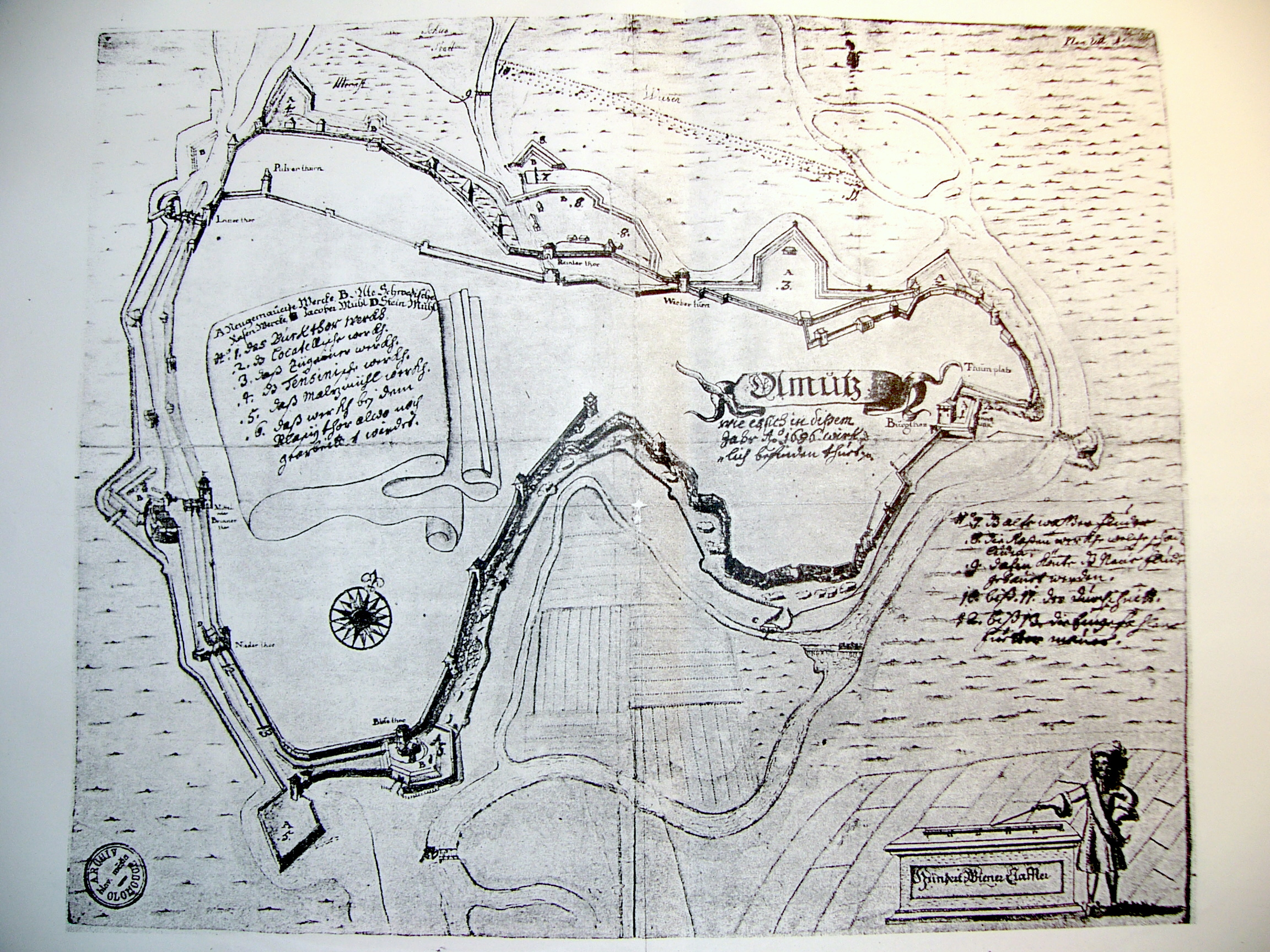
Olomouc fortress in 1686

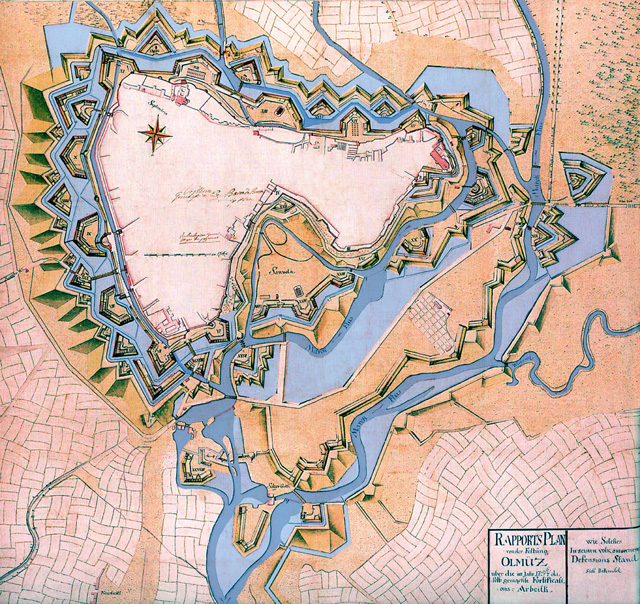
Olomouc bastion fortress in 1757

Participating in the Protestant Reformation, Moravia became mostly Protestant. During the Thirty Years' War, in 1640 Olomouc was occupied by the Swedes for eight years. They left the city in ruins, and as a result it lost its predominant place in Moravia, becoming second to Brno.

In 1740 the town was captured and briefly held by the Prussians. Olomouc was fortified by Maria Theresa during the wars with Frederick the Great, who besieged the city unsuccessfully for seven weeks in 1758. In 1848 Olomouc was the scene of the emperor Ferdinand's abdication. Two years later, Austrian and German statesmen held a conference here called the Punctation of Olmütz. At the conference, they agreed to restore the German Confederation and Prussia accepted leadership by the Austrians.

In 1746 the first learned society in the lands under control of the Austrian Habsburgs, the Societas eruditorum incognitorum in terris Austriacis, was founded in Olomouc to spread Enlightenment ideas. Its monthly Monatliche Auszüge was the first scientific journal published in the Habsburg empire.

Largely because of its ecclesiastical links to Austria, Salzburg in particular, the city was influenced by German culture since the Middle Ages. Demographics before censuses can only be interpreted from other documents. The town's ecclesiastical constitution, the meetings of the Diet and the locally printed hymnal, were recorded in Czech in the mid-16th and 17th centuries. The first treatise on music in Czech was published in Olomouc in the mid-16th century. The political and social changes that followed the Thirty Years' War increased the influence of courtly Habsburg and Austrian/German-language culture. The "Germanification" of the town likely resulted from the cosmopolitan nature of the city; as the cultural, administrative and religious centre of the region, it drew officials, musicians and traders from all over Europe.

Despite these influences, Czech dominated, particularly in ecclesiastical publications throughout the 17th and 18th centuries. When the Austrian-born composer and musician Philip J. Rittler accepted a post at the Wenceslas Cathedral in the latter 17th century, he felt it necessary to learn Czech. With the continued dominance of the Habsburgs and migration of ethnic Germans into the area, the use of Czech declined. By the 19th century, the number of ethnic Germans in the city were recorded as three times higher than the number of Czechs.

After the 1848 revolution, the government rescinded its Jewish expulsion order of 1454. Jews returned to the city and, in 1897, built a synagogue. The Jewish population reached 1,676 in 1900.

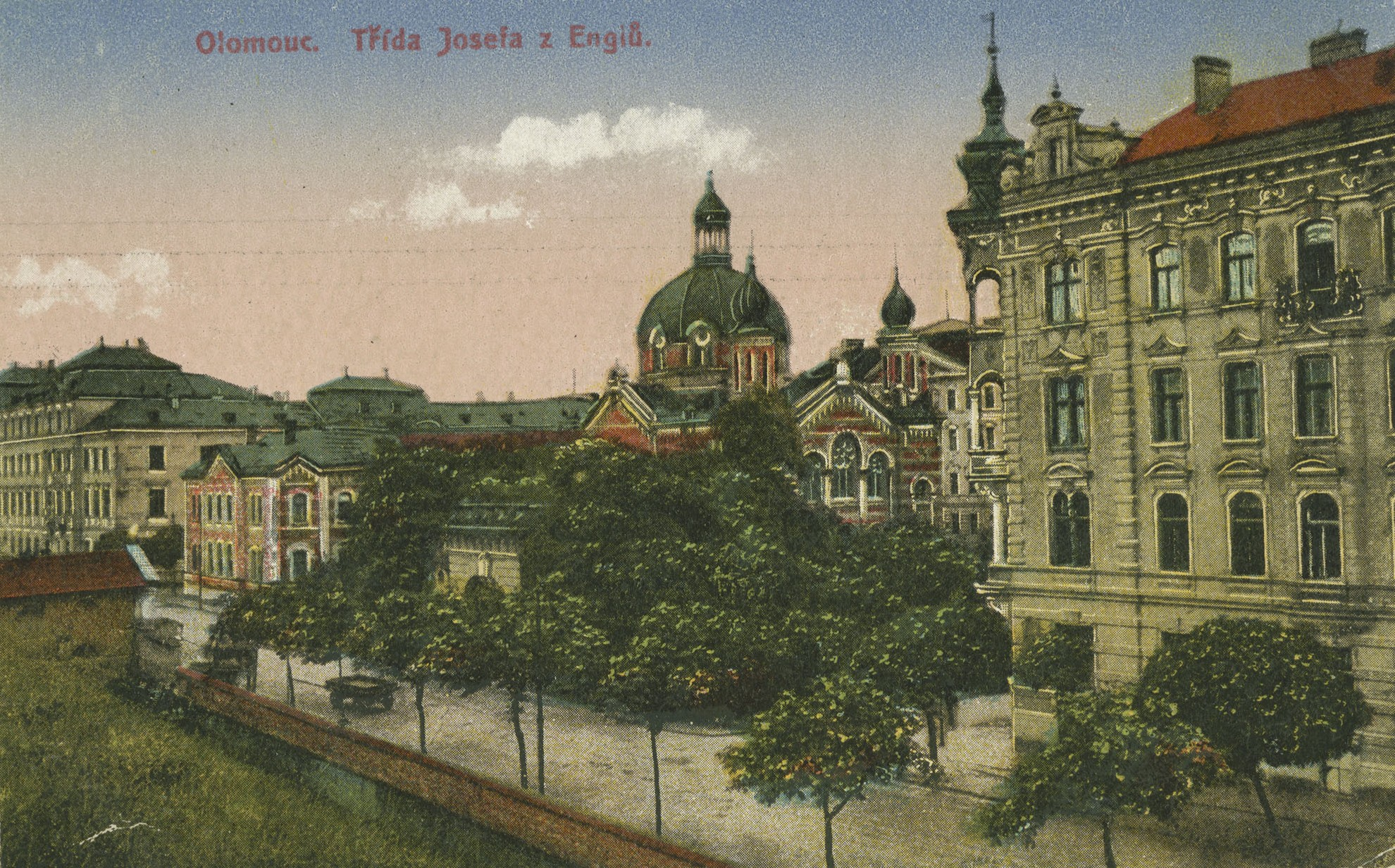
Olomouc Synagogue, 1900s

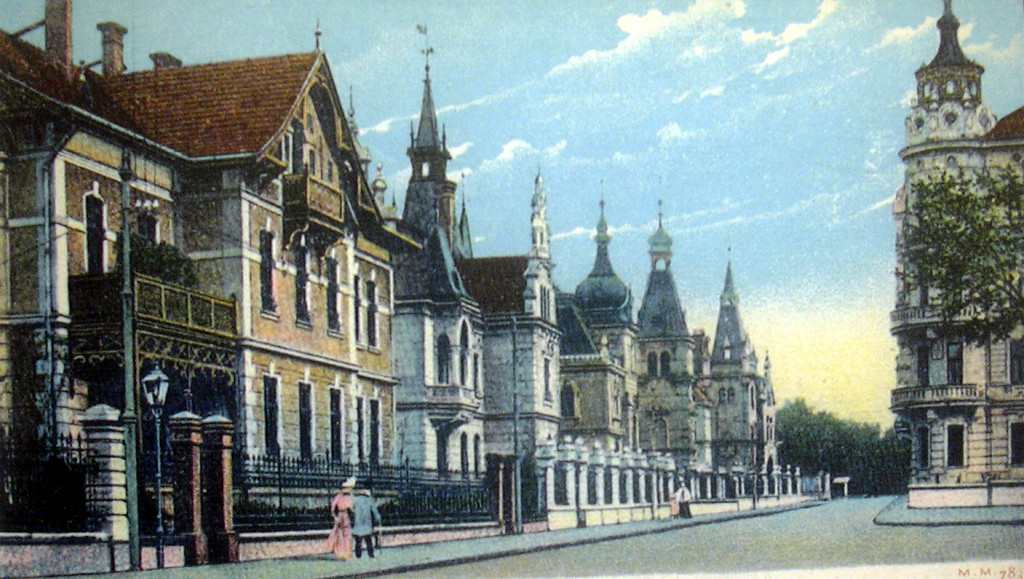
1907 postcard of Olomouc

Olomouc retained its defensive city walls almost until the end of the 19th century. This suited the city council, because demolishing the walls would have allowed for expansion of the city and attracted more Czechs from neighbouring villages. The city council preferred Olomouc to be smaller and predominantly German. Greater expansion came after World War I and the establishment of Czechoslovakia. In 1919 Olomouc annexed two neighbouring towns and 11 surrounding villages, gaining new space for additional growth and development.

Serious tensions arose between ethnic Czechs and Germans during both world wars. During World War II, the city was under German occupation and most of the city's ethnic German residents sided with the Nazis; the German-run city council renamed the main square (until then named after president Tomáš Garrigue Masaryk) after Adolf Hitler. World War II brought a rise in anti-semitism and attacks on the Jews that reflected what was happening in Germany. On Kristallnacht (10 November 1938), townspeople destroyed the synagogue. In March 1939, city police arrested 800 Jewish men, and had some deported to the Dachau concentration camp. During 1942–1943, ethnic Germans sent the remaining Jews to Theresienstadt and other German concentration camps in occupied Poland. Fewer than 300 of the city's Jews survived the Holocaust. The Germans also established and operated a Gestapo prison in the city, and a forced labour camp in the Chválkovice district.

After Olomouc was liberated, Czech residents took back the original name of the city square. When the retreating German army passed through the city in the final weeks of the war, they shot at its 15th-century astronomical clock, leaving only a few pieces intact (these are held in the local museum). The city was restored to Czechoslovakia, although with a Soviet-installed communist regime with stayed in power until the Fall of Communism in the 1980s. In the 1950s, the clock was reconstructed under the influence of Soviet government; it features a procession of proletarians rather than saints. After the war, the government participated in the expulsion of ethnic Germans from the country, following the Allied leaders' Potsdam Agreement, which redefined the Central European borders, although many of these people's families had lived for two centuries in the region. There were the statue of the first president T. G. Masaryk reconstructed as a symbol of come back of democracy on Masaryk street after "velvet revolution" in 1990. Its inner city is the third-largest urban monument reservation in the country, after Prague.

== Demographics ==
Historical population

Year	Pop.	±%
1869	30,134	—
1880	39,440	+30.9%
1890	43,755	+10.9%
1900	52,607	+20.2%
1910	59,852	+13.8%

Year	Pop.	±%
1921	66,060	+10.4%
1930	77,602	+17.5%
1950	73,714	−5.0%
1961	80,246	+8.9%
1970	89,386	+11.4%

Year	Pop.	±%
1980	99,328	+11.1%
1991	102,786	+3.5%
2001	102,607	−0.2%
2011	101,003	−1.6%
2021	106,063	+5.0%

Source: Censuses

== Economy ==
The Olomouc agglomeration was defined as a tool for drawing money from the European Structural and Investment Funds. It is an area that includes the city and its surroundings, linked to the city by commuting and migration. It has about 401,000 inhabitants and also includes the cities of Přerov and Prostějov.

== Transport ==
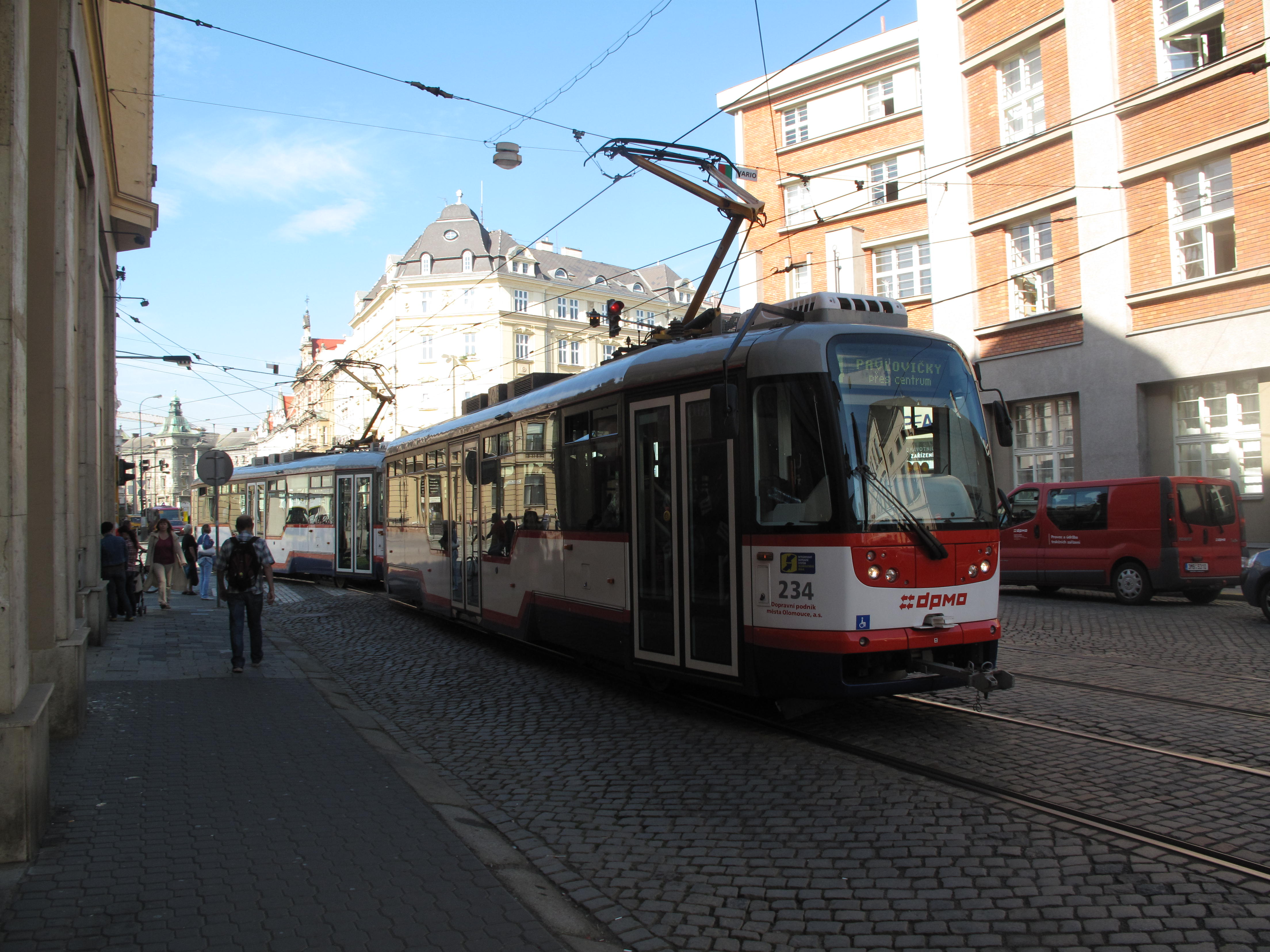
A tram in Olomouc

Public transport in Olomouc is provided by trams and buses.

The first train arrived in Olomouc on 17 October 1841 from Vienna. In 1845, the first omnibuses connected the railway station and the centre of Olomouc. In 1899, omnibuses were replaced with trams.

The main railway station in Olomouc (Olomouc hlavní nádraží) is an important railway junction. The city is connected with Prague, Ostrava, Brno, Zlín and Břeclav. Passenger trains of all categories operated by České dráhy, RegioJet and LEO Express make stops there.

The D35 motorway goes along the southern and western municipal border. The D46 motorway splits from it and connects Olomouc with Prostějov.

== Culture ==
The city is the home of the Moravian Theatre Olomouc (Moravské divadlo) and the Moravian Philharmonic (Moravská filharmonie Olomouc). In 2023 it was decided for them to be merged into a single institution. Olomouc is also the centre of the ethnographic region of Haná. As a student city with the second oldest university in the country, Olomouc hosts many cultural events and festivals: Academia Film Olomouc, Festival of Animated Film (PAF), Divadelní Flora and many others. There are several theatre venues (including Divadlo na cucky, Divadlo Tramtarie or Divadlo K3). Cinema is represented by a single screen Kino Metropol (opened in 1933) and three multiplexes.

== Education ==
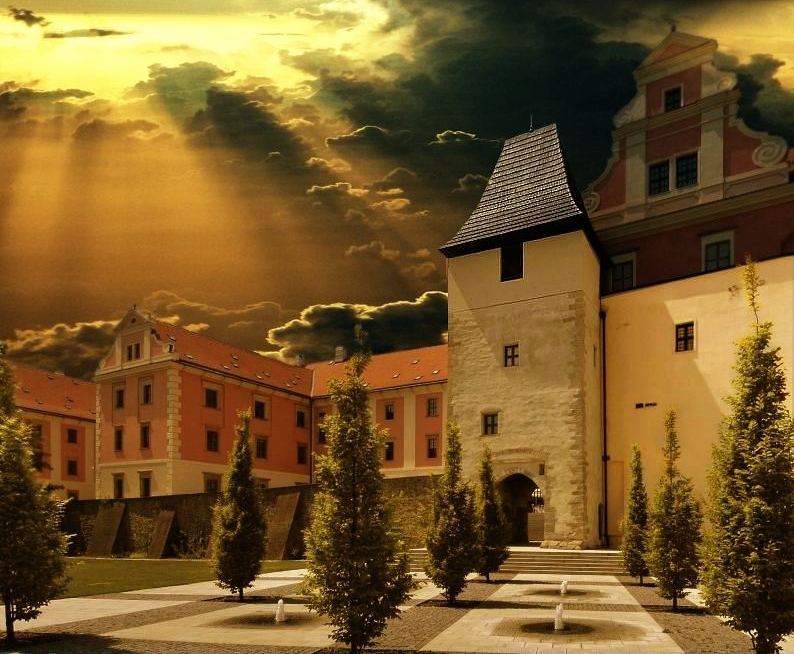
Lower courtyard of the University Art Centre (former Jesuit College building) with the so-called "Jewish Gate", which is part of the original fortification

Palacký University, the oldest in Moravia and second oldest in the Czech Republic, was founded in 1573 as part of an effort to reestablish Roman Catholicism in the country. At the time, roughly nine out of ten inhabitants of the Lands of the Bohemian Crown were Protestants. Most of its faculties were suppressed in the 1850s by the Habsburg régime in retaliation for professor and student support for the 1848 revolution and the Czech National Revival. The university was fully restored in 1946; it was renamed Palacký University of Olomouc.

The university plays a very important role in the life of the city: with over 25,200 students (including those at Moravian College Olomouc), Olomouc has the highest density of university students in Central Europe. Many of the city's services are student-oriented. They close during holidays and the university exam periods. During the summer holiday, the trams run solo (apart from rush-hours), while during the university sessions, the lines are served by two coupled trams.

The university buildings comprise about a third of the city's heritage centre; notable ones include the University Art Centre and the so-called Armoury (now Central Library).

The city was also the inaugural host for the first International Biology Olympiad in 1990.

== Sport ==
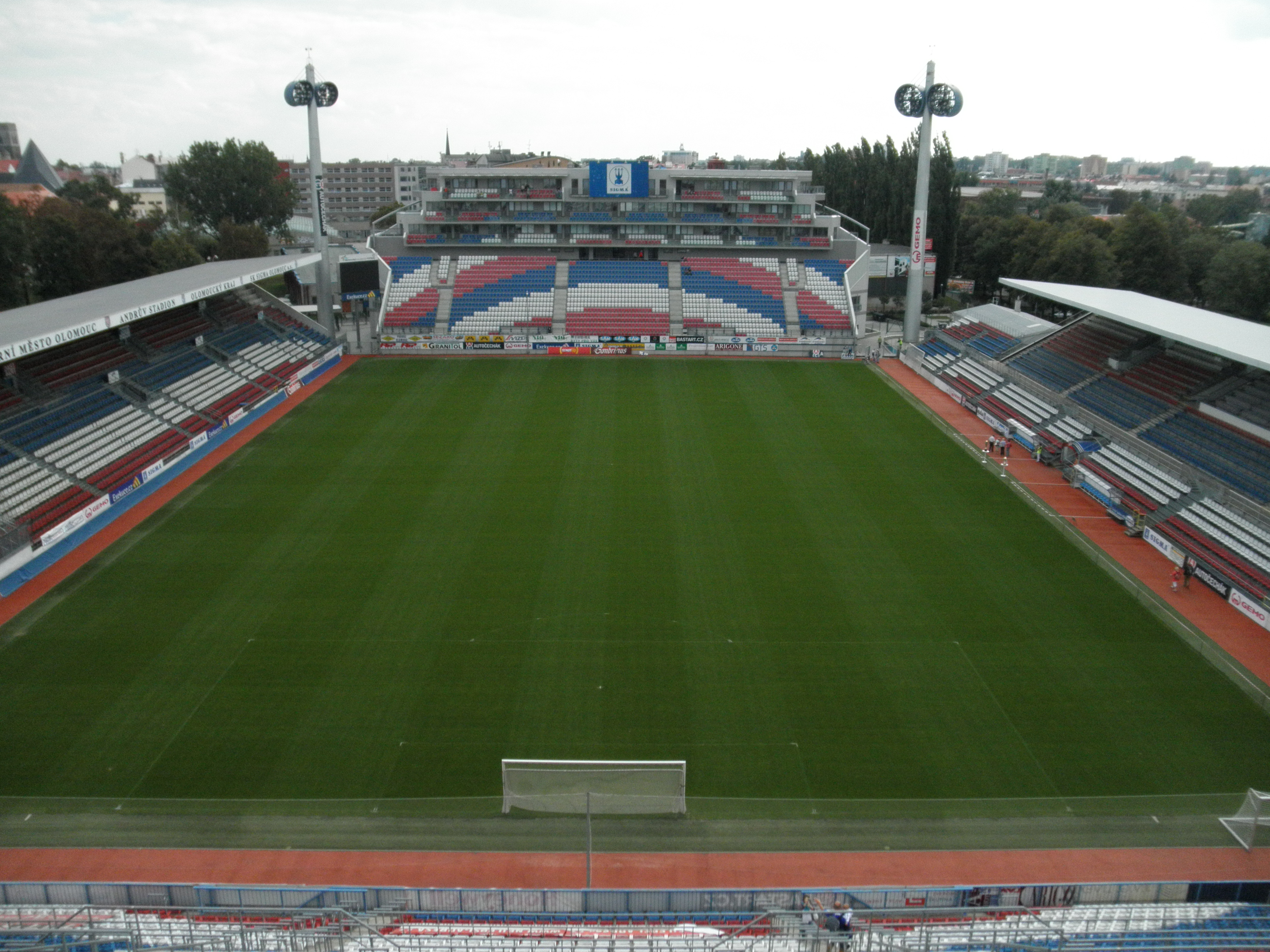
Andrův stadion

Olomouc is home to the professional football club SK Sigma Olomouc playing in the Czech First League. Its reserve team, SK Sigma Olomouc B, plays in the Czech National Football League. Sigma Olomouc plays its home matches at Andrův stadion with a capacity of 12,474 seats, which regularly hosts international matches as well. The second football club in the city is 1. HFK Olomouc.

The city's ice hockey club is HC Olomouc, playing in the Czech Extraliga (top tier). It plays its home matches at Zimní stadion Olomouc. RC Olomouc is a rugby club, playing in the third-tier competition.

On the north west side and adjacent of the Andrův stadion was a facility called the Spartakiad Stadium, which was built after World War II. The stadium was used for various purposes and promoted the Spartakiad, most notably during the 1950s and 1960s. The site also held motorcycle speedway and hosted a final round of the Czechoslovak Individual Speedway Championship in 1964, 1968 and 1969.

== Sights ==
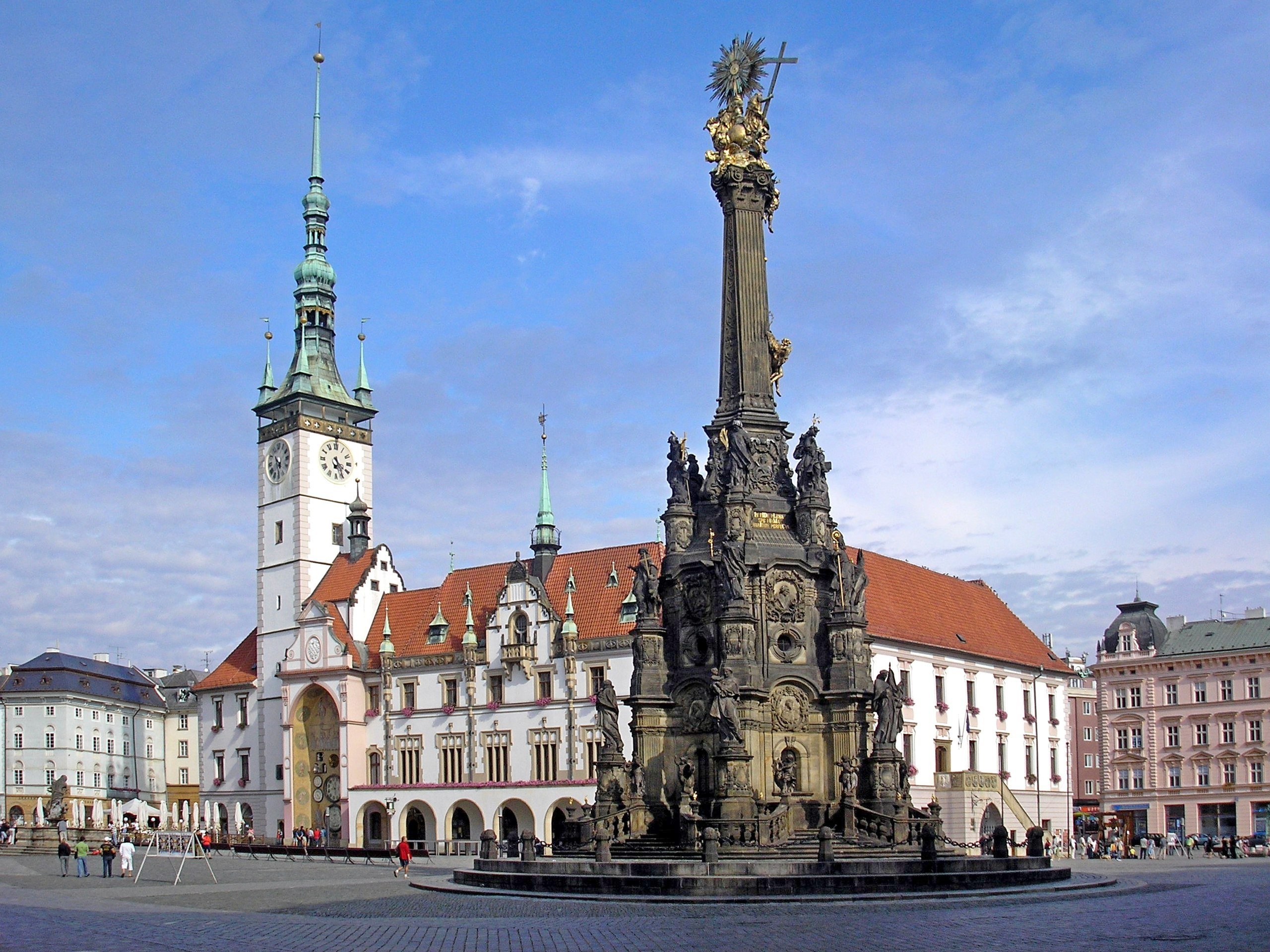
Horní Square

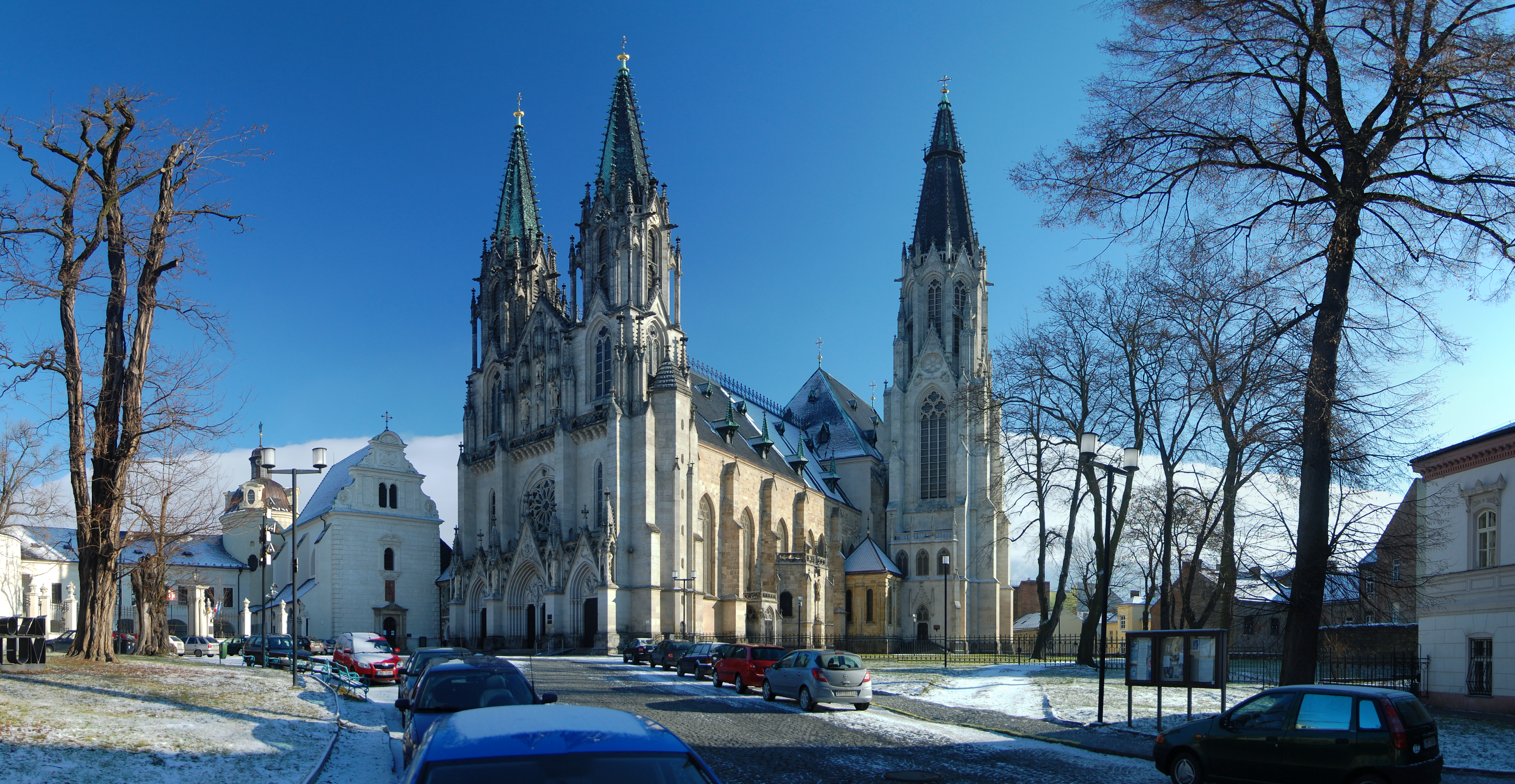
Saint Wenceslas Cathedral

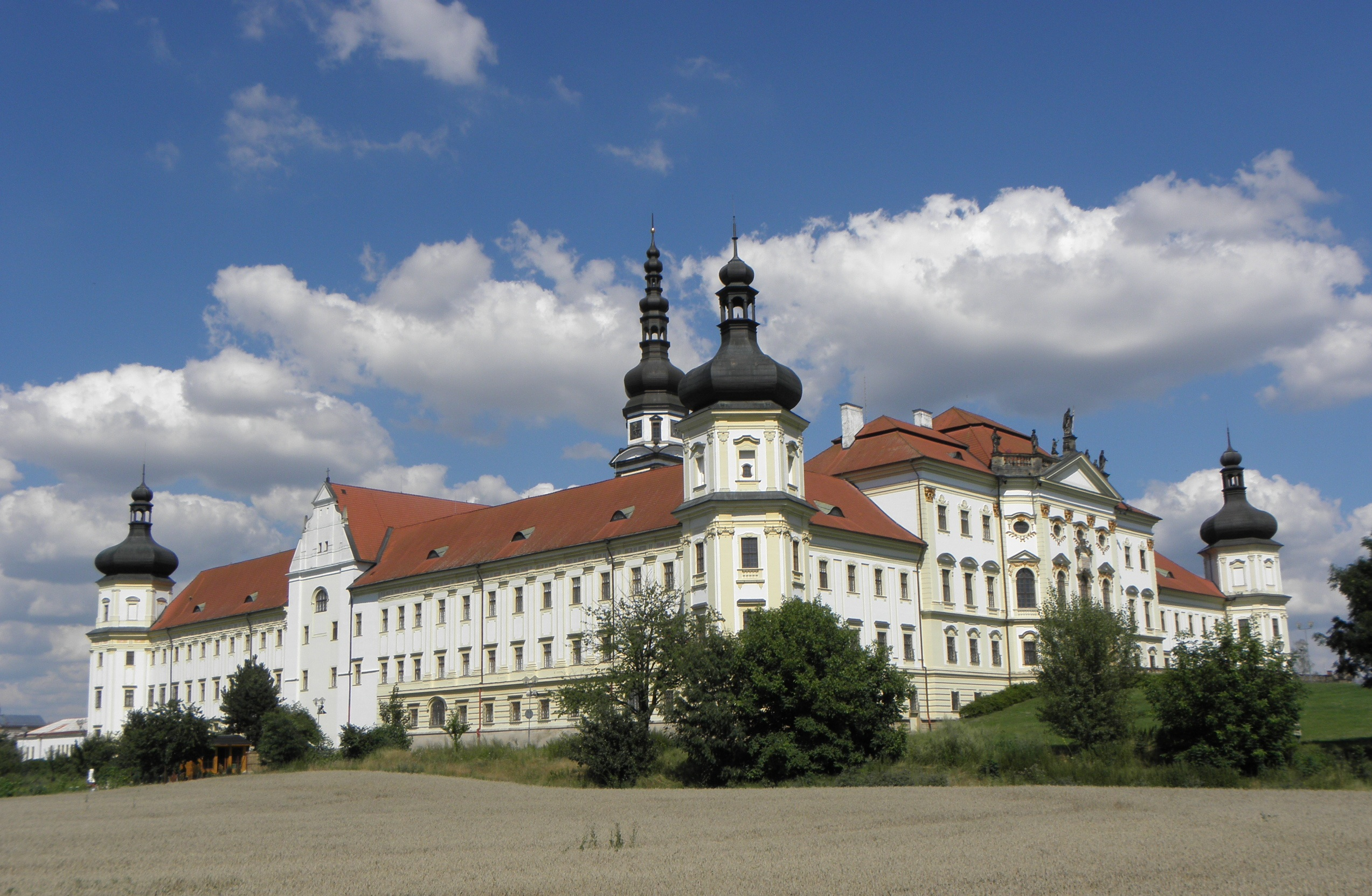
Hradisko Monastery

Olomouc contains several large squares, the chief of which is adorned with the Holy Trinity Column, designated as a UNESCO World Heritage Site. The column is 115 ft (35 m) high and was built between 1716 and 1754.

The city has numerous historic religious buildings. The most prominent church is Saint Wenceslas Cathedral founded before 1107 in the compound of the Olomouc Castle. At the end of the 19th century, the cathedral was rebuilt in the neo-Gothic style. It kept many features of the original church, which had renovations and additions reflecting styles of different ages: Romanesque crypt, Gothic cloister, Baroque chapels. The highest of the three spires is 328 ft (100 m), the second-highest in the country (after Cathedral of St. Bartholomew in Plzeň). The church is next to the Bishop Zdík's Palace (also called the Přemyslid Palace), a Romanesque building built after 1141 by the bishop Jindřich Zdík. It remains one of the most precious monuments of Olomouc: Such an early bishop's palace is unique in Central Europe. The Přemyslid Palace, used as the residence of Olomouc dukes from the governing Přemyslid dynasty, stood nearby.

Church of Saint Maurice, a fine Gothic building of the 15th century, has the 6th-largest church organ in Central Europe.

Church of Saint Michael is notable. The Neo-baroque Chapel of Saint John Sarkander stands on the site of a former town prison. At the beginning of the Thirty Years' War, the Catholic priest John Sarkander was imprisoned here. Accused of collaboration with the enemy, he was tortured but did not reveal anything because of the Seal of Confession and died. The torture rack and Sarkander's gravestone are preserved here. He was canonized by Pope John Paul II during his visit in Olomouc in 1995.

John Paul II also visited Svatý Kopeček ("The Holy Hillock"), which has the magnificent Baroque Church of the Visitation of the Virgin Mary. It overlooks the city. The Pope promoted the church to Minor Basilica. Several monasteries are in Olomouc, including Hradisko Monastery, Convent of Dominican Sisters in Olomouc and others.

Other notable destinations are the Olomouc Orthodox Church, consecrated to Saint Gorazd, and the Mausoleum of Yugoslav Soldiers. This monument commemorates 1,188 Yugoslav soldiers who died during World War I in local hospitals after being wounded on battlefields.

The principal secular building is the city hall, completed in the 15th century. It is flanked on one side by a gothic chapel, now adapted and operated as the Olomouc Museum of Art. It has a tower 250 ft (76 m) high, adorned with an astronomical clock in an uncommon Socialist Realist style. The original 15th-century clock was destroyed at the end of World War II. It was reconstructed in 1947–1955 by Karel Svolinský, who used the government-approved style of the time, featuring proletarians rather than saints. This is also the reason why the clock's calendar represents some of the most important days of the Communist regime.

Olomouc has unique set of six Baroque fountains. They survived in such number thanks to the city council's caution. While most European cities were removing old fountains after building water-supply piping, Olomouc decided to keep them as reservoirs in case of fire. The fountains feature ancient Roman motifs; five portray the Roman gods Jupiter (image), Mercury (image), Triton (image), Neptune and Hercules (image). One features Julius Caesar, the legendary founder of the city (image). In the 21st century, an Arion fountain was added to the main square, inspired by the older project.

In front of the astronomical clock on the Horní ("Upper") Square, which is the largest square in Olomouc, is a scale model of the entire old town in bronze.

== Honours ==
The asteroid 30564 Olomouc was named after the city.

== Notable people ==
=== Public service ===
- Joseph von Petrasch (1714–1772), soldier, writer and philologist; lived here from 1758
- Anton Schübirz von Chobinin (1748–1801), Austrian General-major
- Alexander von Krobatin (1849–1933), Austrian Field Marshal Imperial Minister for War in 1912–1917
- Hermann Hiltl (1872–1930), Austrian army officer
- Paul Engelmann (1891–1965), Austrian-Israeli architect
- Zdeněk Fierlinger (1891–1976), diplomat and politician, prime minister of Czechoslovakia in 1944–1946
- Jacques Groag (1892–1962), architect and interior designer
- Franz Karmasin (1901–1970), German politician in Czechoslovakia and SS Officer
- Jaroslav Otruba (1916–2007), architect, urban planner, designer and artist
- Jiří Pelikán (1923–1999), journalist and politician
- Pavel Dostál (1943–2005), Minister of Culture in 1998–2005
- Franz Josef Wagner (born 1943), German journalist
- Jiří Paroubek (born 1952), politician and Prime Minister in 2005–2006
- Ivan Langer (born 1967), politician

=== Religion ===
- Augustinus Olomucensis (1467–1513), humanist and theologian
- Charles Joseph of Lorraine (1680–1715) prelate, known as Charles III as Bishop of Olomouc
- Archduke Rudolf of Austria (1788–1831), consecrated as Archbishop of Olomouc in 1819
- Franziskus von Sales Bauer (1841–1915), Cardinal of the Roman Catholic Church and Archbishop of Olomouc in 1904–1915
- Berthold Oppenheim (1867–1942), the rabbi of Olomouc in 1892–1939
- John M. Oesterreicher (1904–1993), Roman Catholic theologian and a leading advocate of Jewish–Catholic reconciliation
- Jan Graubner (born 1948), Roman Catholic archbishop of Olomouc in 1992–2022

=== Science and academia ===
- Valentin Stansel (1621–1705), Jesuit and astronomer who worked in Brazil
- Karel Ferdinand Irmler (1650–?), lawyer and the first professor of secular law at University of Olomouc
- Josef Vratislav Monse (1733–1793), lawyer, historian and professor of law, Rector at the University of Olomouc in 1780
- Anton Schrötter von Kristelli (1802–1875), Austrian chemist and mineralogist
- Rudolf Eitelberger (1817–1885), Austrian art historian and founder of the Vienna School of Art History
- Ludwig Karl Schmarda (1819–1908), Austrian naturalist and traveller
- Berthold Hatschek (1854–1941), Austrian zoologist
- Olga Taussky-Todd (1906–1995), Austrian and later Czech-American mathematician
- Jan G. Švec (born 1966), voice scientist, invented videokymography, used for diagnosis of voice disorders
- Jaroslav Miller (born 1971), professor of history and rector at Palacký University
- Tomáš Hudeček (born 1979), university professor and politician

=== Arts ===
- Georg Flegel (1566–1638) German painter
- Gottfried Finger (1655/6–1730), composer
- Joseph Ignatz Sadler (1725–1767), painter
- Cajetan Tschink (1763–1813), Austrian writer; worked and taught here
- Hans Balatka (1827–1899) American conductor and composer
- Adolf Hölzel (1853–1934), German painter
- Leo Fall (1873–1925), Austrian composer
- Adolf Kašpar (1877–1934), painter and illustrator
- Erma Zarska (1889–1971), opera singer
- Egon Kornauth (1891–1959), Austrian composer and music teacher
- Edgar G. Ulmer (1904–1972), Austrian-American film director
- Peter Schmidl (1942–2025), Austrian clarinetist
- Emil Viklický (born 1948), jazz pianist and composer
- Lenka Procházková (born 1951), writer
- Vladimír Havlík (born 1959), action artist, painter and pedagogue
- Pavel Vítek (born 1962), singer and actor
- Rostislav Čtvrtlík (1963–2011), stage, television and voice actor
- Zora Vesecká (born 1967), child actress
- Veronika Vařeková (born 1977), model

=== Sport ===
- Evžen Rošický (1914–1942), athlete, journalist and resistance fighter
- Karel Brückner (born 1939), football coach
- Jiří Kavan (1943–2010), handball player
- Martin Kotůlek (born 1969), football player and manager
- David Prinosil (born 1973), German tennis player
- Radim Kořínek (born 1973), cyclist
- Josef Karas (born 1978), decathlete and beauty pageant titleholder
- František Huf (born 1981), bodybuilder and model
- Jiří Hudler (born 1984), ice hockey player
- Karlos Vémola (born 1985), mixed martial artist, bodybuilder and Greco-Roman wrestler
- Tomáš Kalas (born 1993), footballer
- Václav Jemelka (born 1995) footballer
- Karolína Muchová (born 1996), tennis player
- David Zima, (born 2000), footballer

== Twin towns – sister cities ==
Olomouc is twinned with:

- Antony, France
- Kraków, Poland
- Kunming, China
- Lucerne, Switzerland
- Makarska, Croatia
- Nördlingen, Germany
- Old Town (Bratislava), Slovakia
- Owensboro, United States
- Pécs, Hungary
- Subotica, Serbia
- Tampere, Finland
- Treptow-Köpenick (Berlin), Germany
- Veenendaal, Netherlands

== Gallery ==
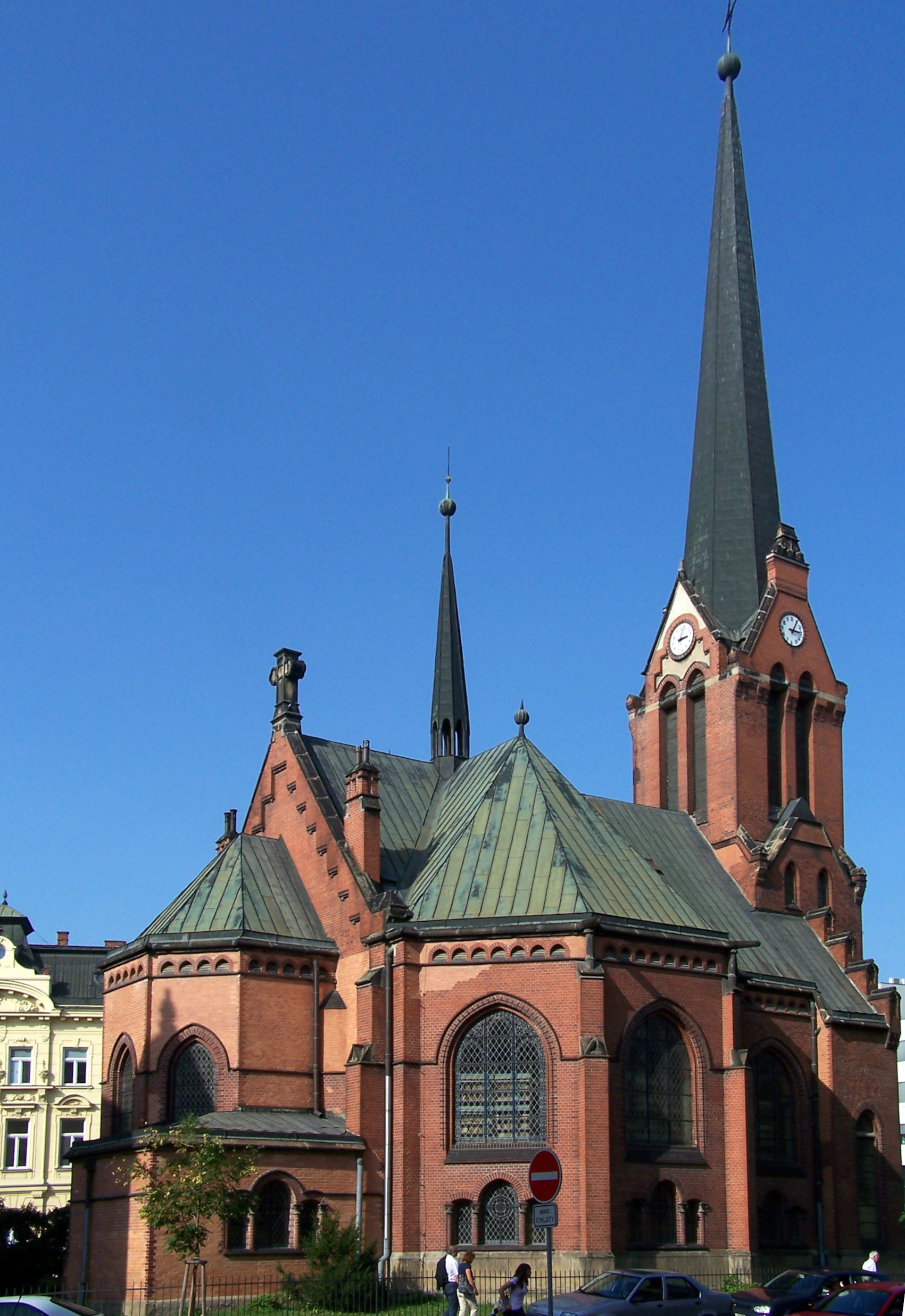
Red Church

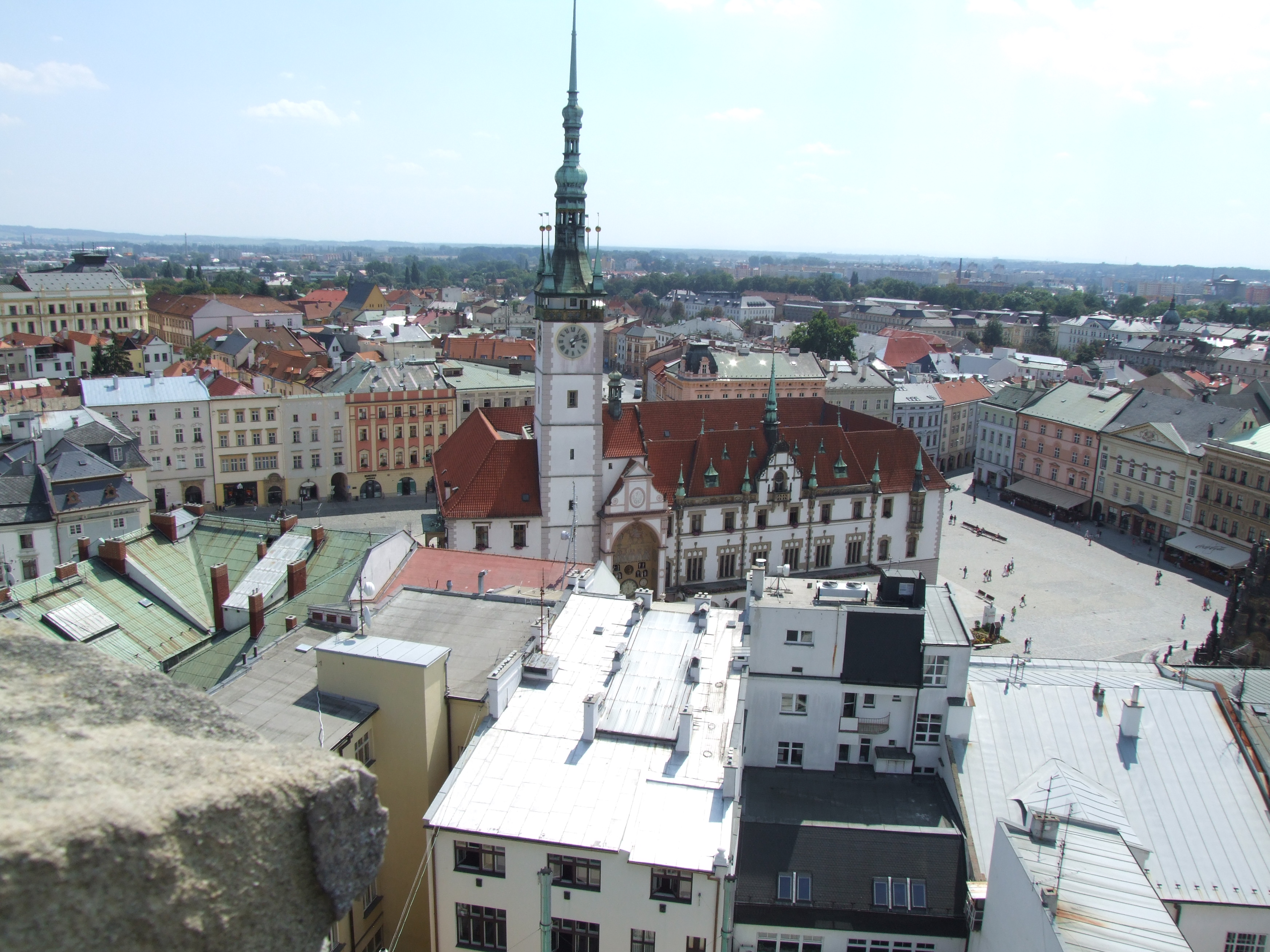
Olomouc from above

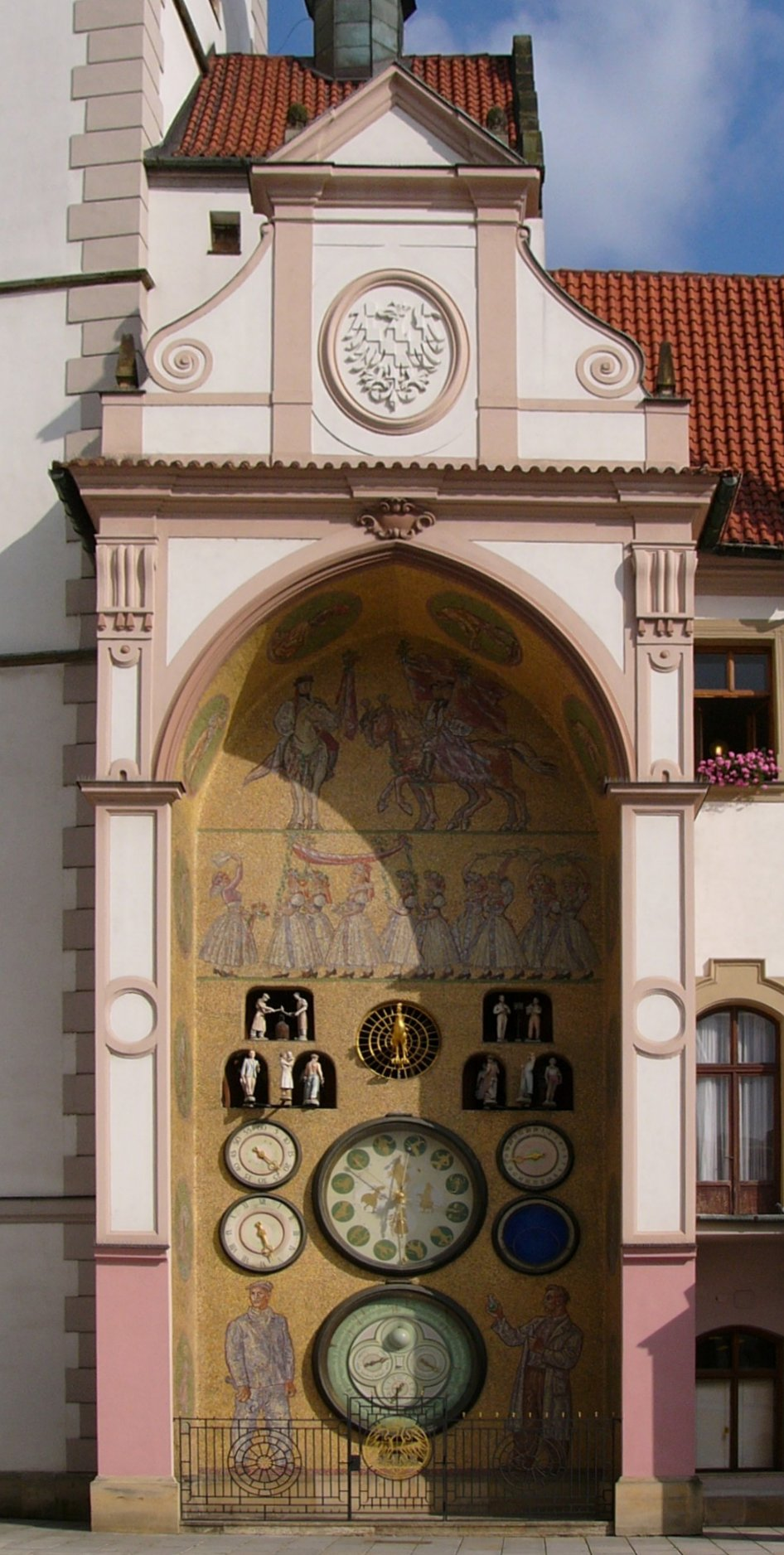
Olomouc astronomical clock

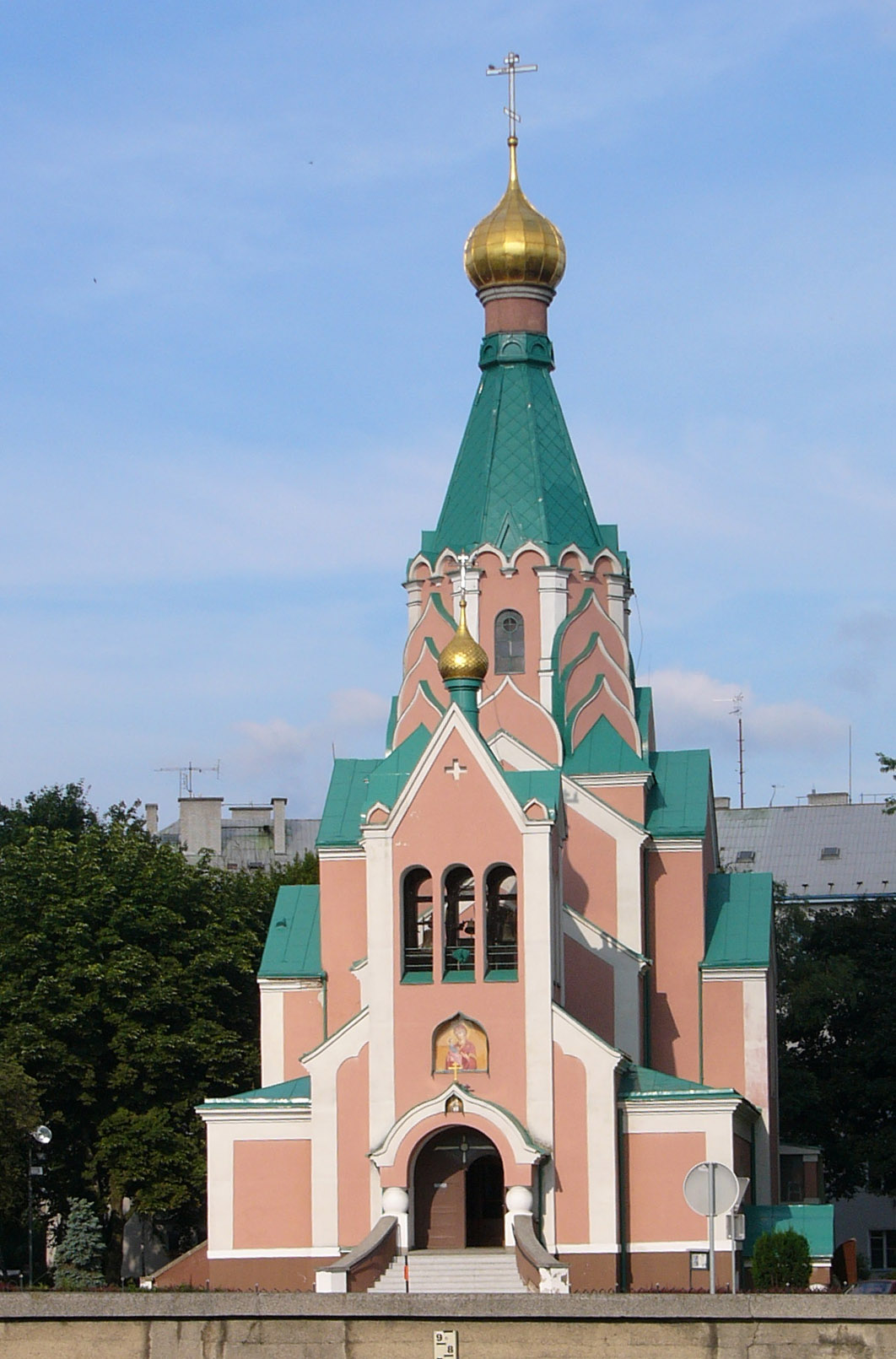
Olomouc Orthodox Church

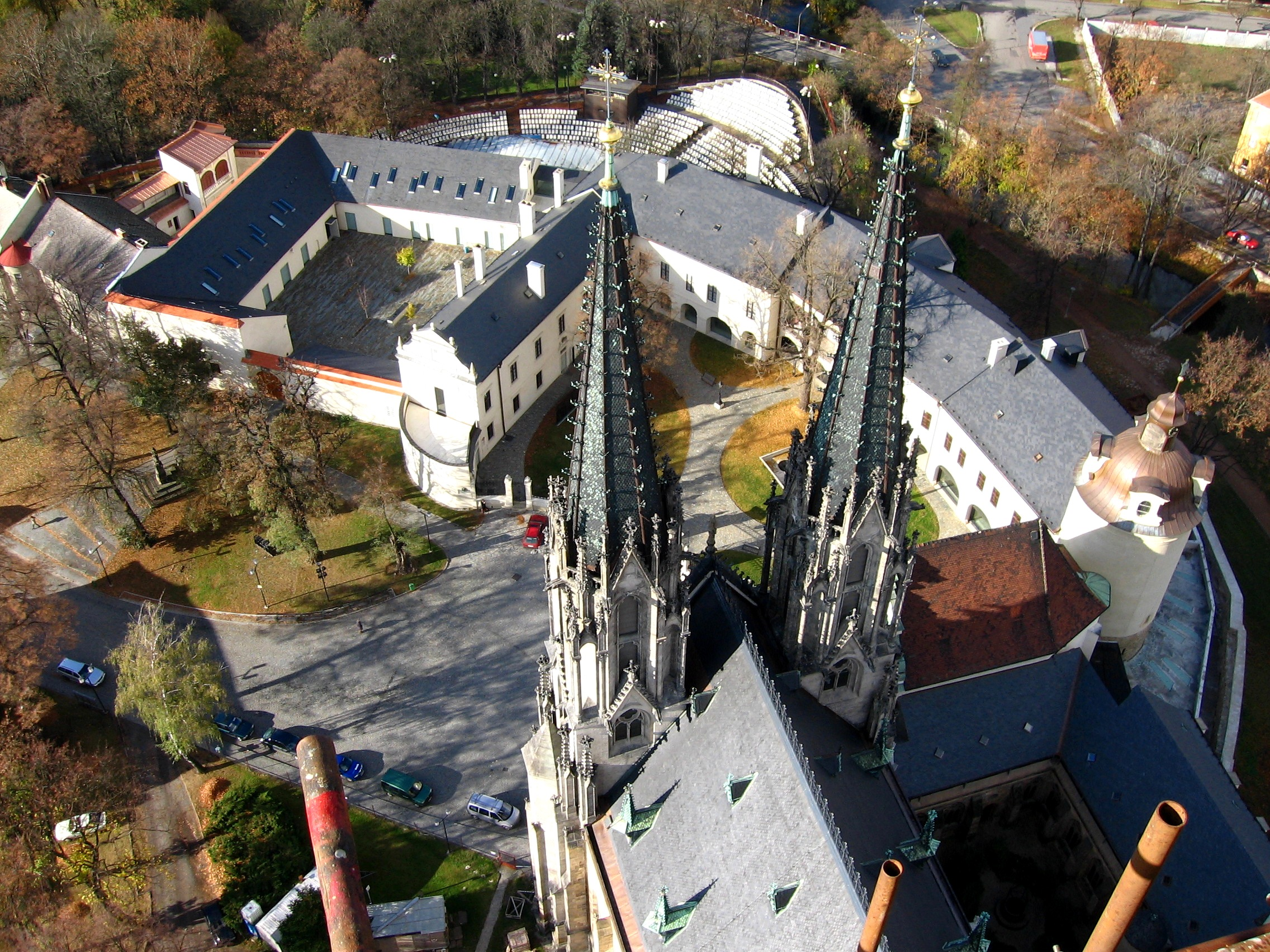
The Archidiocesan Museum

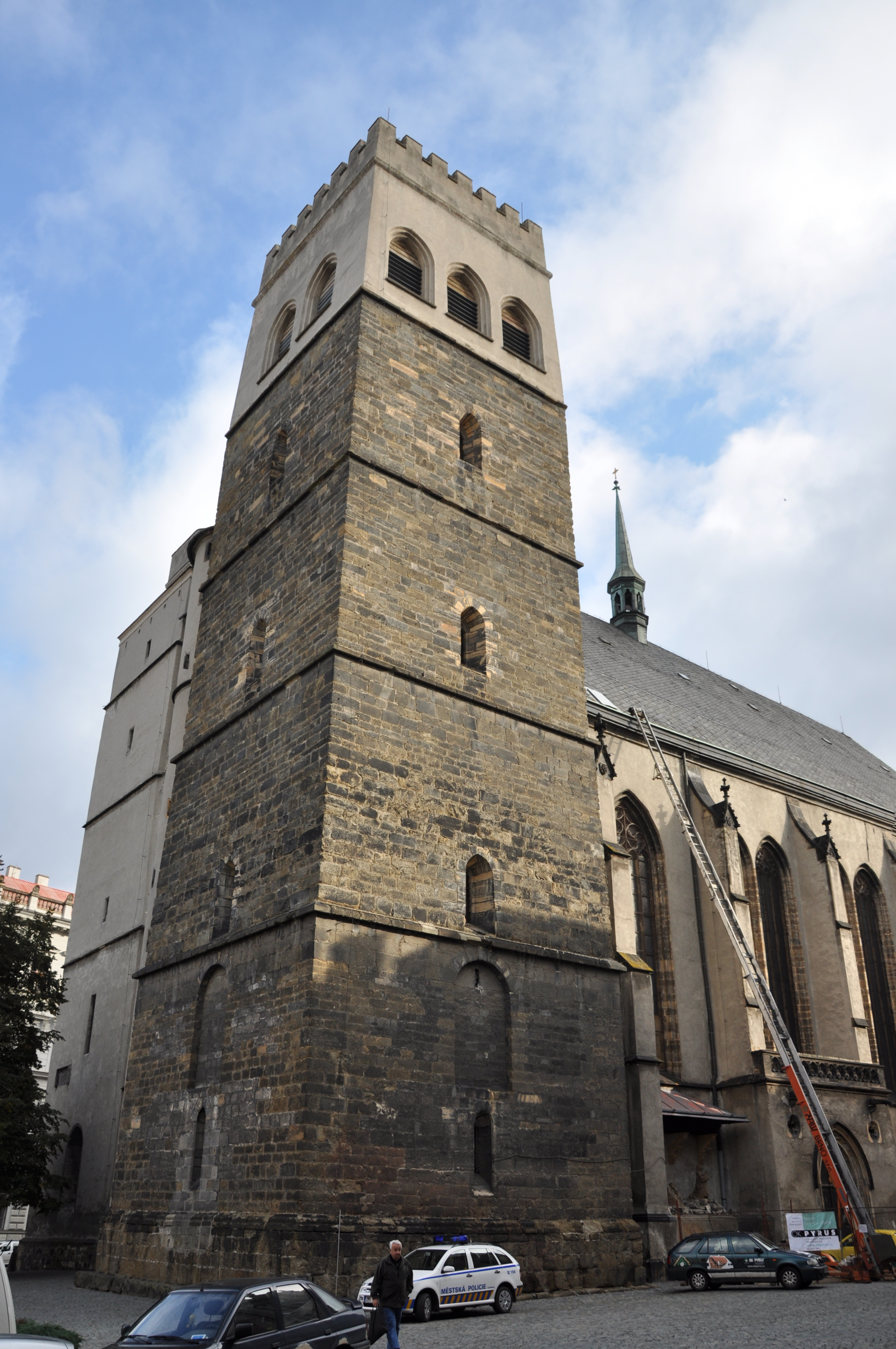
Church of Saint Maurice

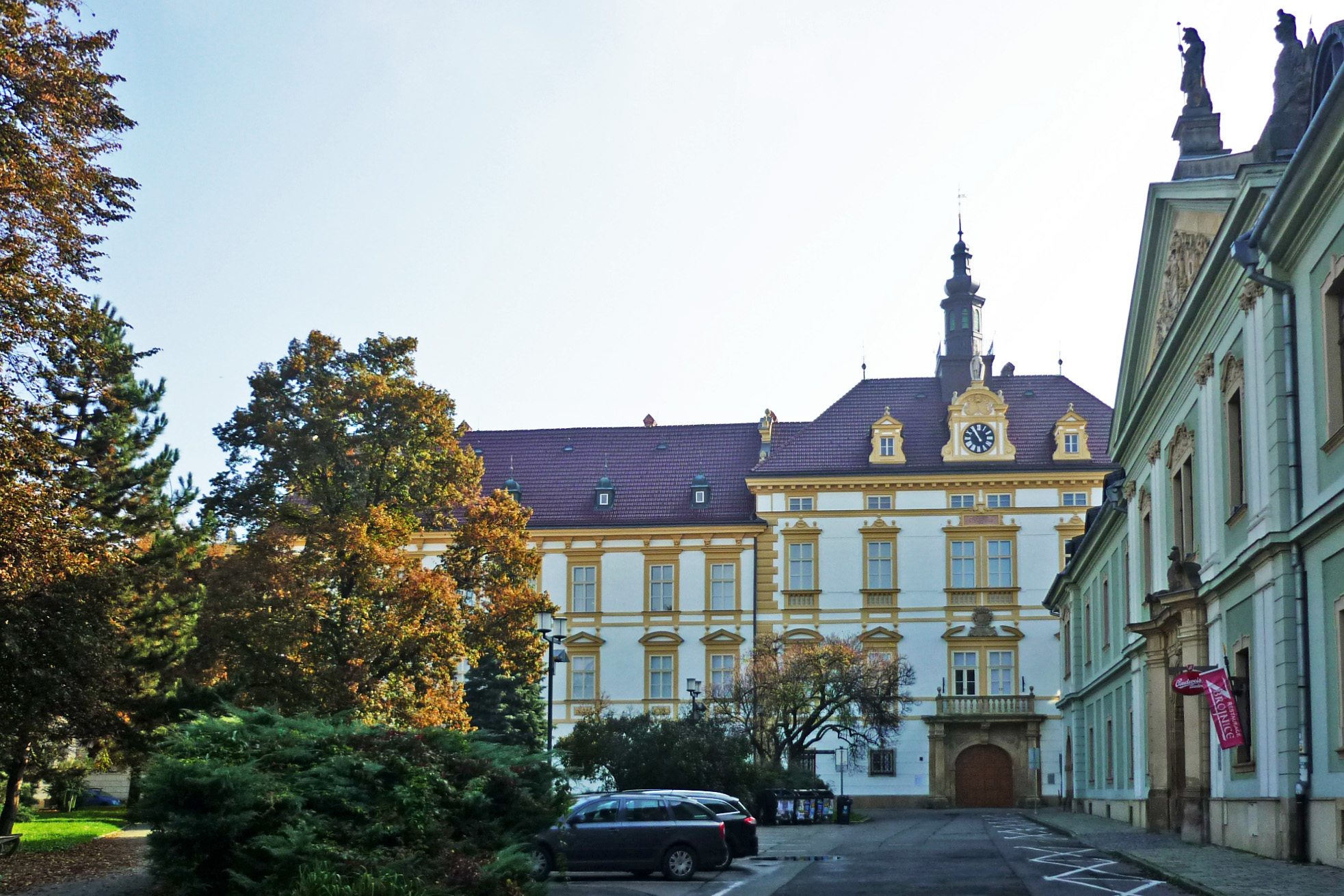
Archbishop's Palace

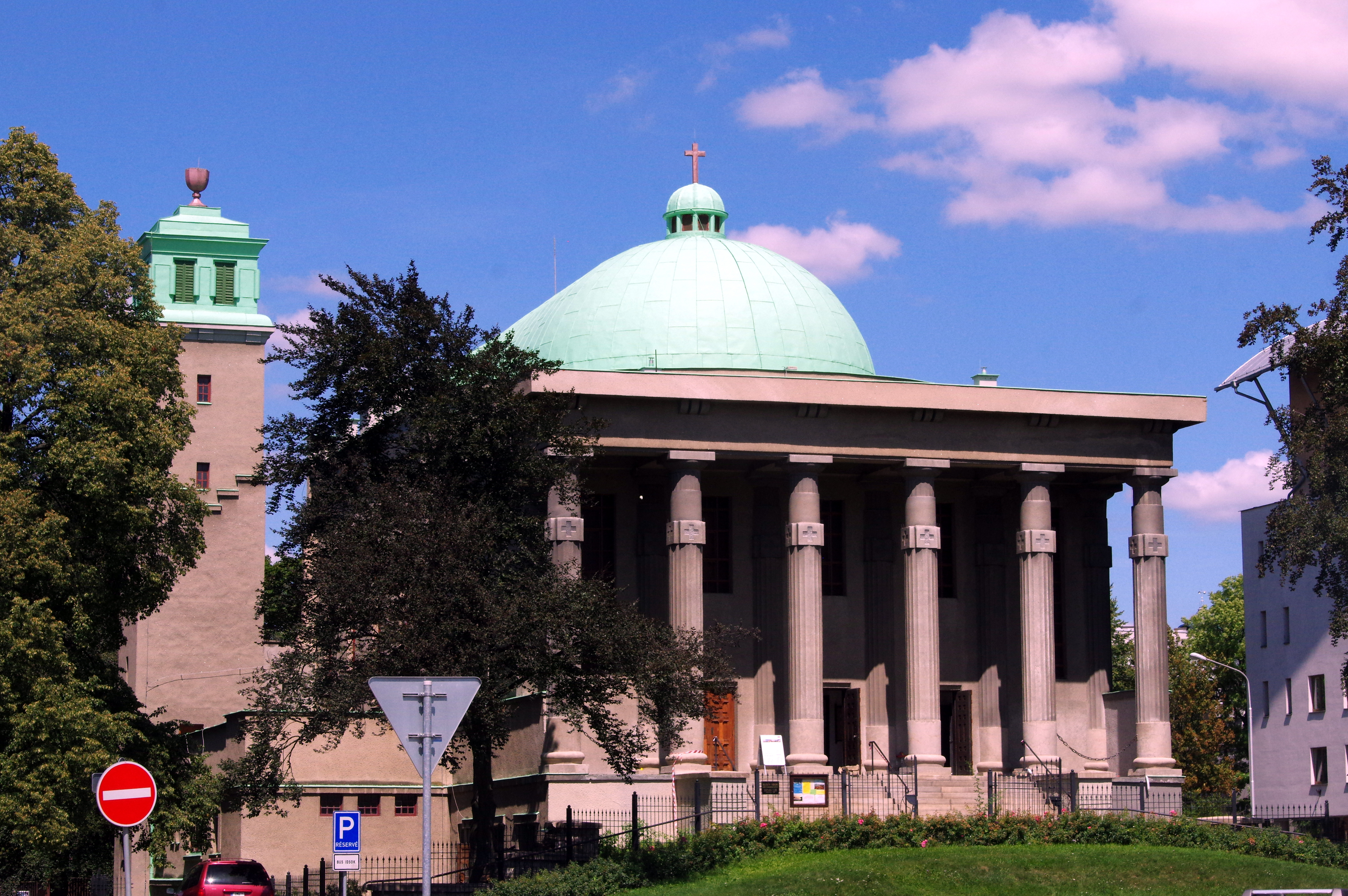
Hussite church

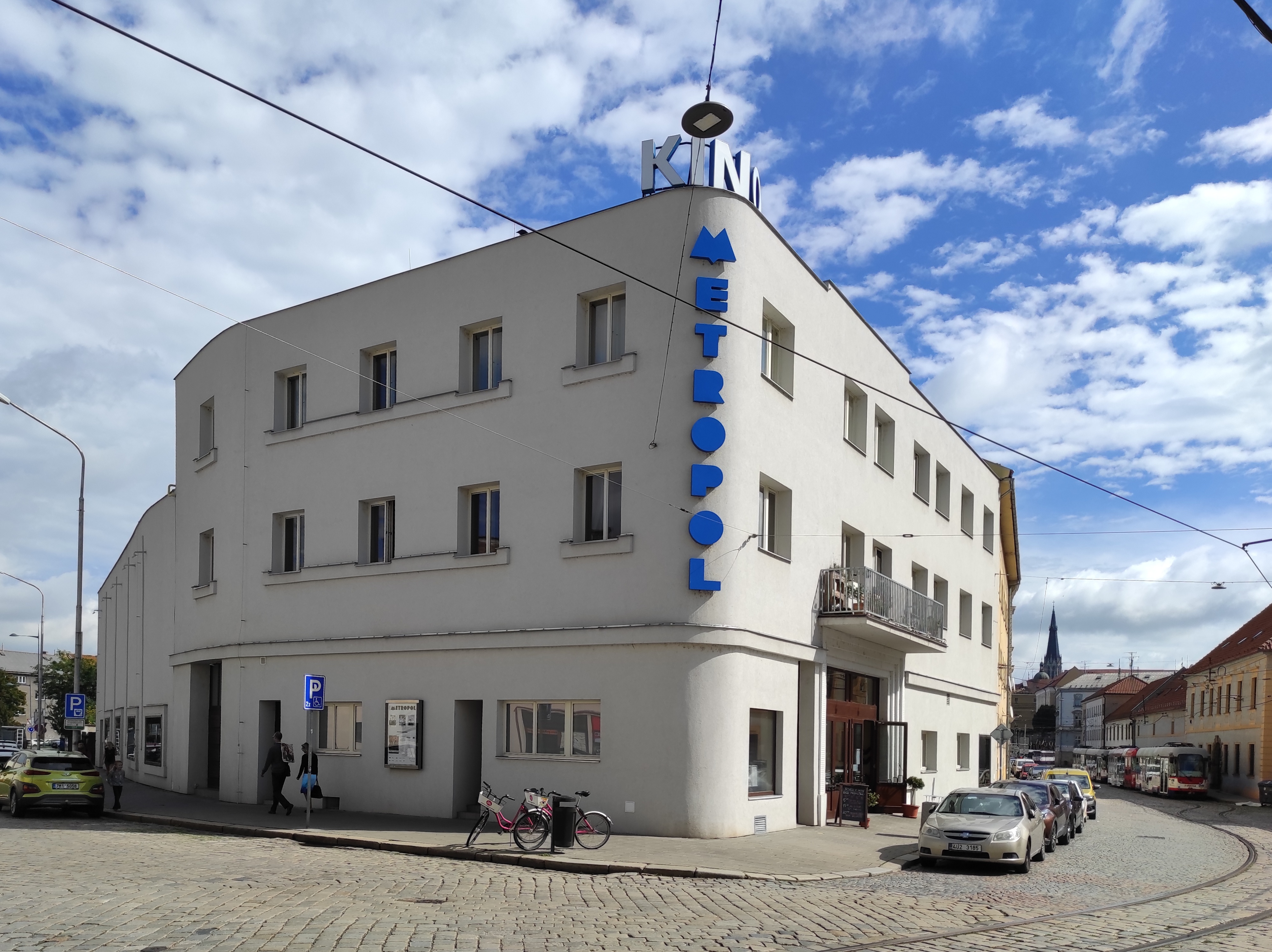
Metropol Cinema

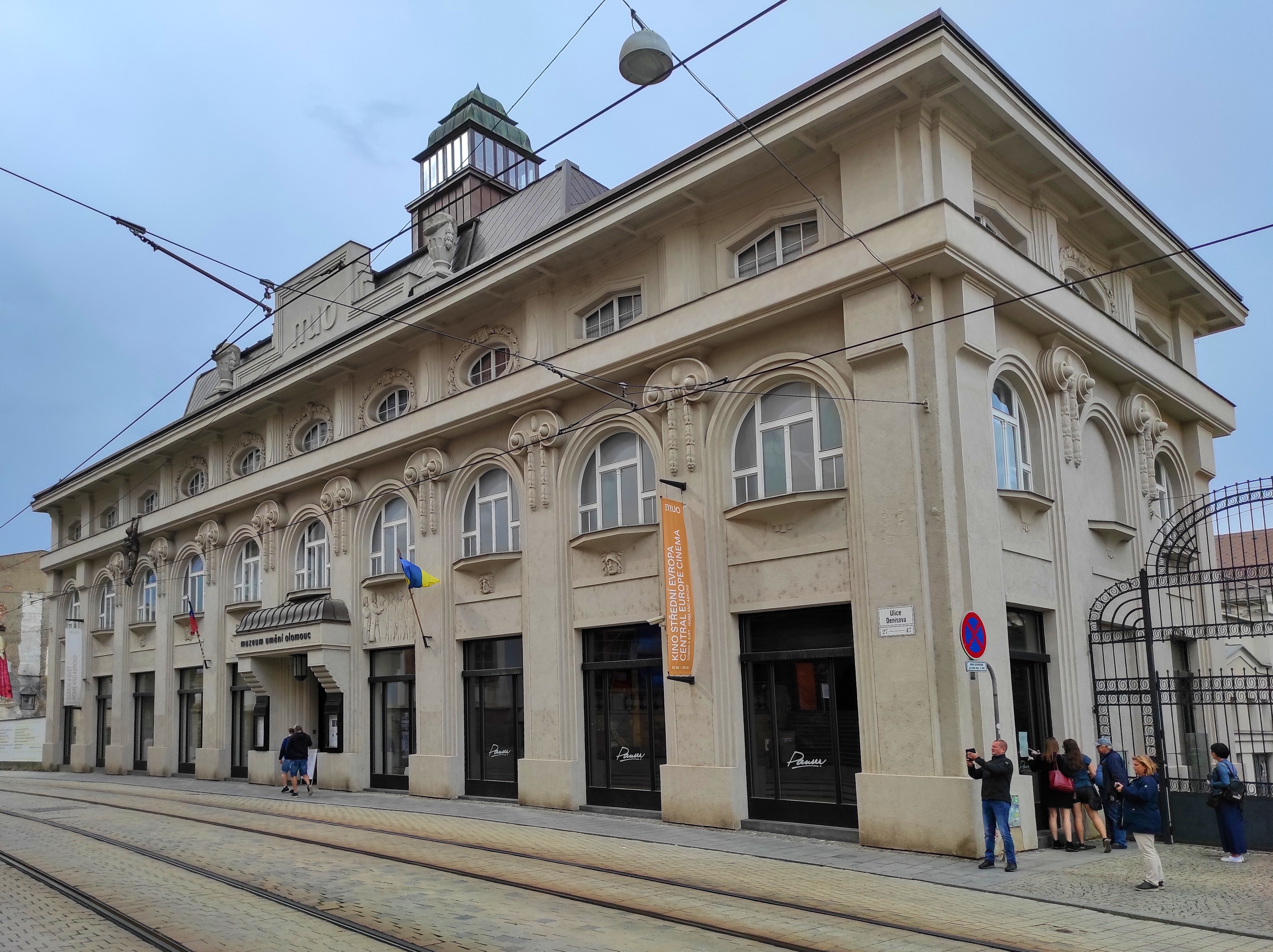
Museum of Arts, Central Cinema

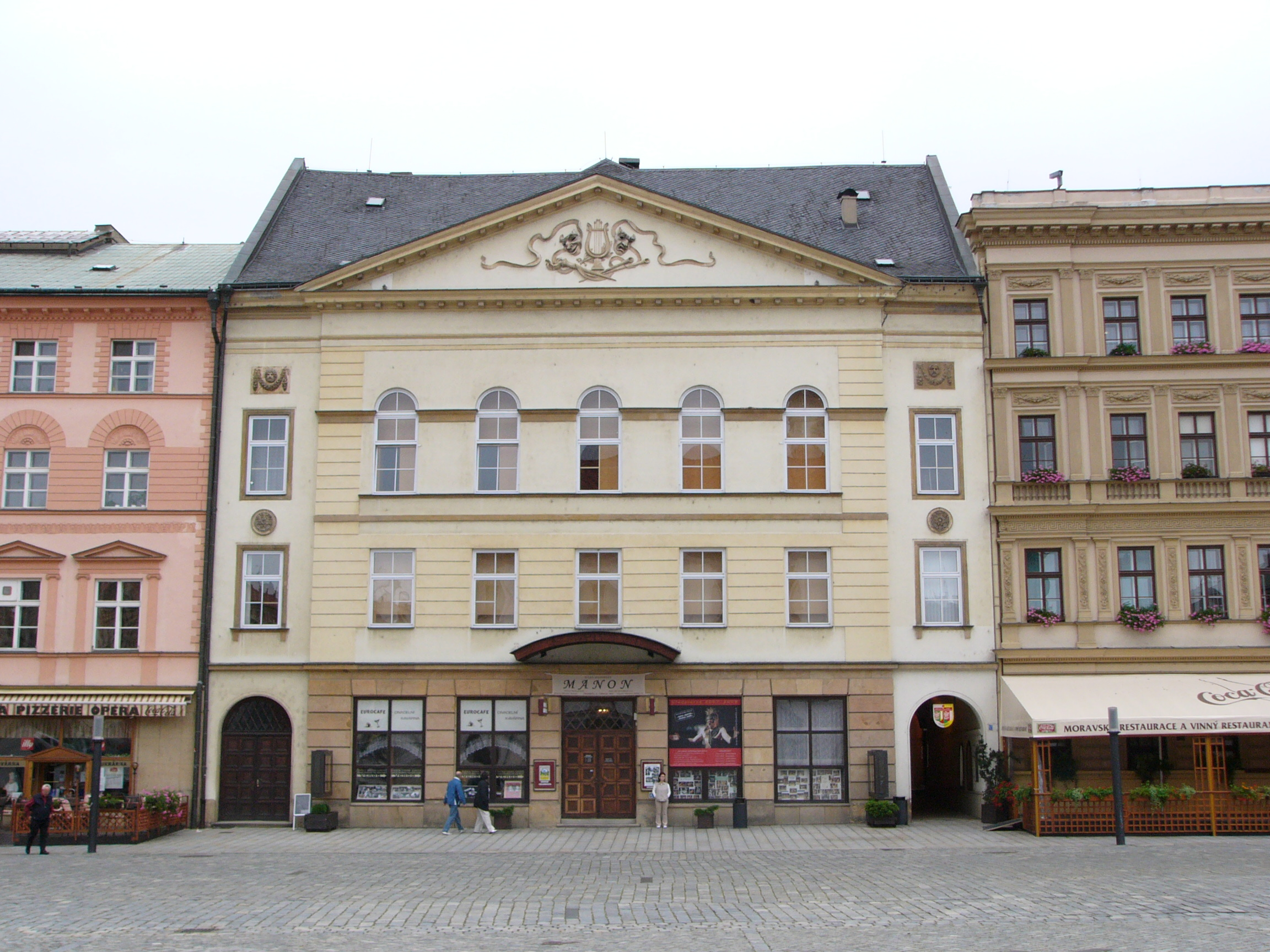
Moravian Theatre

== See also ==
- Academia Film Olomouc
- List of bishops and archbishops of Olomouc
