= Church of Saint Michael (Olomouc) =

Roman Catholic church in the Czech Republic

- Kostel svatého Michala
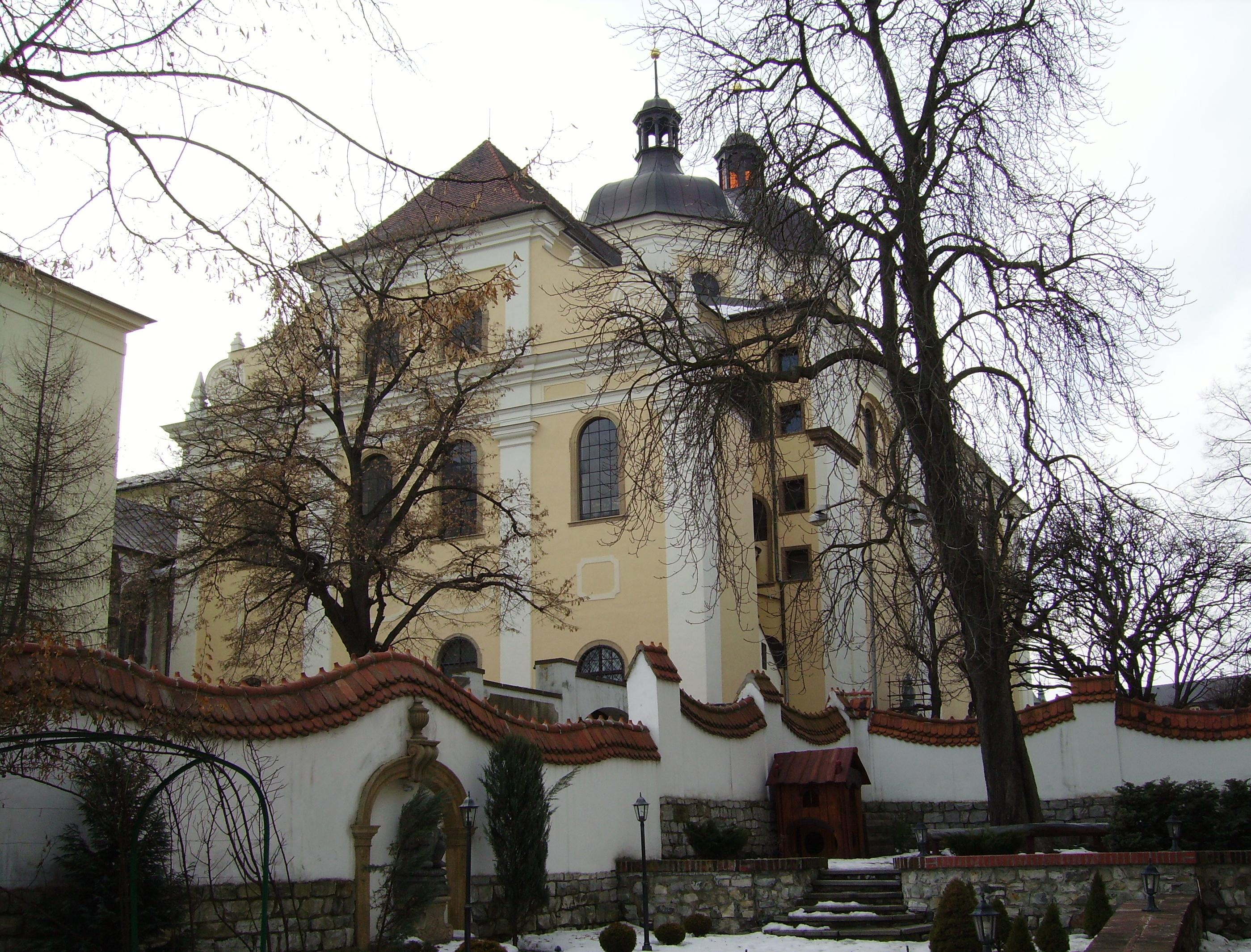
- Church of Saint Michael

Religion
- Affiliation: Roman Catholic
- Diocese: Archdiocese of Olomouc
- Ecclesiastical or organizational status: Active
- Year consecrated: 1707

Location
- Location: Olomouc, Czech Republic
- Interactive map of Church of Saint Michael
- Coordinates: 49°35′38″N 17°15′15″E

Architecture
- Architect: Giovanni Pietro Tencalla
- Type: Church
- Style: Baroque
- Completed: 1703

Specifications
- Length: 59 m
- Width: 20 m
- Height (max): 37 m (121 ft)

Church of Saint Michael (Czech: Kostel svatého Michala) is a Roman Catholic church in Olomouc, Czech Republic. It is one of the most important landmarks of the city.

The church, connected originally with the Dominican Order, was constructed in the 13th century, and reconstructed to its current Baroque form from 1676 to 1703 by Giovanni Pietro Tencalla. Stucco ornamentation for the interior was provided by Baltazar Fontana. The church was consecrated on 9 May 1707; however in July 1709, it was damaged by a large fire.

The church is characterised by its three domes symbolizing the Holy Trinity. The underside of each domes is frescoed. The church organ is original from 1706, made by David Sieber, an organist from Brno.
